= Extended BIOS =

Extended BIOS may refer to:

- XIOS, the extended BIOS in Digital Research's MP/M, Concurrent CP/M, Concurrent DOS, Multiuser DOS and REAL/32 (since 1979)
- XBIOS, the extended BIOS in Atari TOS-based computers (since 1984/1985)
- EX-BIOS, non-standard BIOS extensions in the HP Vectra series of computers (since 1985)

== See also ==
- BIOS extension
- Enhanced BIOS (LBA)
- VESA BIOS Extensions (VBE)
