= Disk restore card =

In computer hardware, a disk restore card, restore card, reborn card or disk protection card is an expansion card that can restore the system storage device (such as hard disk drive) contents in every computer boot process. It can undo some or all file system changes since the previous boot. The disk restore card is usually used in schools, libraries and internet cafes.

The disk restore card can protect the computer from computer viruses and incorrect configurations.

== Details ==
The disk restore card is a PCI or PCI Express based expansion card, and it consists of an Option ROM loaded by the BIOS or by the UEFI/BIOS.
