= Text attributes =

In computing, text attributes (in the sense of attributes of a text) are some data associated with particular chunks of text, except of its characters itself. Say, something more than a plain text.

- See formatted text for text attributes in word processing.
- See HTML#Elements and HTML attribute about text attributes in HTML.
- See text mode for hardware-implemented screen text attributes;
  - particularly, VGA compatible text mode describes such text attributes on PC compatibles.

Also, a text attribute may refer to an attribute (e.g. to an XML attribute), those value consists of a text.
