= VGA (disambiguation) =

Video Graphics Array is a graphics standard for personal computers and associated connectors.

VGA may also refer to:

== Computers ==
- VGA (resolution), 640×480 graphics display resolution
- VGA card
- VGA connector
- VGA text mode

== Technology ==
- Spike Video Game Awards, a now discontinued awards show much like MTV Video Music Awards focused on video games
- The Game Awards, a video game awards show.
- Variable-gain amplifier, a type of amplifier that varies gain based on some control voltage
- Variable gauge axle, a multiple gauge solution used between incompatible railways

== Other ==
- Virginia General Assembly
- Vijayawada Airport
- Vectorspace Geometric Algebra, a field of mathematics
