= VGA text mode =

Computer graphics standard from 1987

VGA text mode was introduced in 1987 by IBM as part of the VGA standard for its IBM PS/2 computers. Its use on IBM PC compatibles was widespread through the 1990s and persists today for some applications on modern computers. The main features of VGA text mode are colored (programmable 16-color palette) characters and their background, blinking, various shapes of the cursor (block/underline/hidden static/blinking), and loadable fonts (with various glyph sizes). The Linux console traditionally uses hardware VGA text modes, and the Win32 console environment has an ability to switch the screen to text mode for some text window sizes.

Distinctive features of VGA text as it is commonly used:

Light gray background (normally not white).

Box-drawing.

Various
back-/foreground
combinations.

Custom/non-ASCII characters

CGA–EGA-style 16-color palette for foreground.
Blinking text.

Cursor.

== Data arrangement ==
=== Text buffer ===
Each screen character is represented by two bytes aligned as a 16-bit word accessible by the CPU in a single operation. The lower (or character) byte is the actual code point for the current character set, and the higher (or attribute) byte is a bit field used to select various video attributes such as color, blinking, character set, and so forth. This byte-pair scheme is among the features that the VGA inherited from the EGA, CGA, and ultimately from the MDA.

Attribute								Character							
7	6	5	4	3	2	1	0	7	6	5	4	3	2	1	0
Blink^{[n 1]}	Background color			Foreground color^{[n. 2]}^{[n. 3]}				Code point							

1. Depending on the mode setup, attribute bit 7 may be either the blink bit or the fourth background color bit (which allows all 16 colors to be used as background colors).
2. Attribute bit 3 (foreground intensity) also selects between fonts A and B (see below). Therefore, if these fonts are not the same, this bit is simultaneously an additional code point bit.
3. Attribute bit 0 also enables underline, if certain other attribute bits are set to zero (see below).

Colors are assigned in the same way as in 4-bit indexed color graphic modes (see VGA color palette). VGA modes have no need for the MDA's reverse and bright attributes because foreground and background colors can be set explicitly.

=== Underline ===
The VGA hardware has the ability to enable an underline on any character that has attribute bit 0 set. However, since this is an MDA-compatible feature, the attribute bits not used by the MDA must be set to zero or the underline will not be shown. This means that only bits 3 (intensity) and 7 (blink) can be set concurrently with bit 0 (underline). With the default VGA palette, setting bit 0 to enable underline will also change the text color to blue. This means text in only two colors can be underlined (5555FF and 0000AA with the default palette).

Despite all this, the underline is not normally visible in color modes, as the location of the underline defaults to a scanline below the character glyph, rendering it invisible. If the underline location is set to a visible scanline (as it is by default when switching to an MDA-compatible monochrome text mode), then the underline will appear.

=== Fonts ===
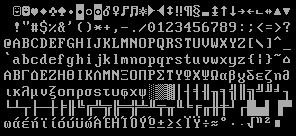
VGA shows us the code page 737 with Greek letters

Screen fonts used in EGA and VGA are monospace raster fonts containing 256 glyphs, and 2 fonts may be used simultaneously, for a total of 512 glyphs. All glyphs on screen are the same size, but that size is variable. Typically, glyphs are 8 dots wide and 8–16 dots high, however the height can be any value up to a maximum of 32. Each row of a glyph is coded in an 8-bit byte, with high bits to the left of the glyph and low bits to the right. Along with several hardware-dependent fonts stored in the adapter's ROM, the text mode offers 8 loadable fonts. Two active font pointers (font A and font B) select two of the available fonts, although they usually point to the same font. When they each point to different fonts, attribute bit 3 (see above) acts as a font selection bit instead of as a foreground color bit. On real VGA hardware, this overrides the bit's use for color selection, but on many clones and emulators, the color selection remains – meaning one font is displayed as normal intensity, and the other as high-intensity. This difference (and incompatibility) can be overcome by changing the palette registers to contain two copies of an 8-color palette. A VGA-capable video card must implement ASCII characters in its Video BIOS; VGA text fonts of other European languages, such as German and Russian, may be defined in other code pages.

There are modes with a character box width of 9 dots (e.g. the default 80×25 mode), however the 9th column is used for spacing between characters, so the content cannot be changed. It is always blank, and drawn with the current background color. An exception to this is in Line Graphics Enable mode, which causes code points 0xC0 to 0xDF inclusive to have the 8th column repeated as the 9th. These code points cover those box-drawing characters which must extend all the way to the right side of the glyph box. For this reason, placing letter-like characters in code points 0xC0–0xDF should be avoided. The box-drawing characters from 0xB0 to 0xBF are not extended, as they do not point to the right and so do not require extending.

=== Cursor ===
Mouse cursor in Impulse Tracker

The shape of the cursor is restricted to a rectangle the full width of the character box, and filled with the foreground color of the character at the cursor's current location. Its height and position may be set to anywhere within a character box;. The EGA and many VGA clones allowed a split-box cursor (appearing as two rectangles, one at the top of the character box and one at the bottom), by setting the end of the cursor before the start, however if this is done on the original VGA, the cursor is completely hidden instead. The VGA standard does not provide a way to alter the blink rate, although common workarounds involve hiding the cursor and using a normal character glyph to provide a so-called software cursor.

A mouse cursor in TUI (when implemented) is not usually the same thing as a hardware cursor, but a moving rectangle with altered background or a special glyph.

Some text-based interfaces, such as that of Impulse Tracker, went to even greater lengths to provide a smoother and more graphic-looking mouse cursor. This was done by constantly re-generating character glyphs in real-time according to the cursor's on-screen position.

=== BIOS Color Attribute ===
Dec	Hex	Binary	Color
0	0	0000	Black
1	1	0001	Blue
2	2	0010	Green
3	3	0011	Cyan
4	4	0100	Red
5	5	0101	Magenta
6	6	0110	Brown
7	7	0111	Light Gray
8	8	1000	Dark Gray
9	9	1001	Light Blue
10	A	1010	Light Green
11	B	1011	Light Cyan
12	C	1100	Light Red
13	D	1101	Light Magenta
14	E	1110	Yellow
15	F	1111	White

A BIOS Color Attribute is an 8 bit value where the low 4 bits represent the character color and the high 4 bits represent the background color. The name comes from the fact that these colors are used in BIOS interrupts, specifically INT 10h, the video interrupt. When writing text to the screen, a BIOS color attribute is used to designate the color to write the text in. For example, to print a white character with a black background, a color attribute of 0F_{hex} would be used. The high four bits are set to 0000_{bin}, representing the background color, black. The low 4 bits, 1111_{bin}, represent the foreground color, white. The highest bit of the color attribute, which is also the highest bit of the background color can take over two functions. It can either have no influence on the background color making text blink when set, effectively limiting the available background colors to only eight, or if intensive background colors are enabled the full 16 colors become available but blinking is no longer available. This behavior can be changed, i.e., using BIOS interrupt 10_{hex}, function 1003_{hex}. By default, when using the BIOS interrupt, the highest bit controls the brightness of colors, and not blinking, but this behavior may differ in other implementations of BIOS colors. This 16 colour palette is often used in console programs (e.g. cmd in Windows) and sometimes for chat in games (e.g. Minecraft).

By default, there are 16 colors for text and only 8 colors for background. There is a way to get all the 16 colors for background, which requires turning off the "blinking attribute".

== Access methods ==
There are generally two ways to access VGA text-mode for an application: through the Video BIOS interface or by directly accessing video RAM and I/O ports. The latter method is considerably faster, and allows quick reading of the text buffer, for which reason it is preferred for advanced TUI programs.

The VGA text buffer is located at physical memory address 0xB8000. Since this address is usually used by 16-bit x86 processes operating in real-mode, it is also the first half of memory segment 0xB800. The text buffer data can be read and written, and bitwise operations can be applied. A part of text buffer memory above the scope of the current mode is accessible, but is not shown.

The same physical addresses are used in protected mode. Applications may either have this part of memory mapped to their address space or access it via the operating system. When an application (on a modern multitasking OS) does not have control over the console, it accesses a part of system RAM instead of the actual text buffer.

For computers in the 1980s, very fast manipulation of the text buffer, with the hardware generating the individual pixels as fast as they could be displayed, was extremely useful for a fast UI. Even on relatively modern hardware, the overhead of text mode emulation via hardware APA (graphics) modes (in which the program generates individual pixels and stores them into the video buffer) may be noticeable.

== Modes and timings ==
=== Video signal ===
From the monitor's side, there is no difference in input signal in a text mode and an All Points Addressable (APA) mode of the same size. A text mode signal may have the same timings as VESA standard modes. The same registers are used on adapter's side to set up these parameters in a text mode as in APA modes. The text mode output signal is essentially the same as in graphic modes, but its source is a text buffer and character generator, not a framebuffer as in APA.

=== PC common text modes ===
Depending on the graphics adapter used, a variety of text modes are available on IBM PC compatible computers. They are listed on the table below:

Mode(s) (decimal)	Mode(s) (hex)	Type	Text res. (W×H)	Char. size	Graphics res.	Colors / memory model	Adapters
7	0007h	VGA Text	80×25	9×14	720×350	2 (mono) / MTEXT	MDA, Hercules
6	0006h	VGA G	80×25	8×8	640×200	2 (mono) / CGA	Hercules, CGA, PCjr, EGA, MCGA
0, 1	0000h, 0001h	VGA Text	40×25	8×8	320×200	16 / CTEXT	CGA, EGA
2	0002h	VGA Text	80×25	8×8	640×200	16 (gray) / CTEXT	CGA, EGA
2, 3	0002h, 0003h	VGA Text	80×25	9×16	720×400	16 / CTEXT	
16	0010h	VGA G	80×25	8×14	640×350	4 / PL4, 16 / PL16	64k EGA, 256k EGA, VGA
17	0011h	VGA G	80×30	8×16	640×480	2 (mono) / PL1	VGA, MCGA, ATI EGA, ATI VIP
23, 88	0017h, 0058h	VGA Text	80×43	8×8	640×350, 640×348	16 / CTEXT	NEL Electronics BIOS, EGA
102	0066h	VESA Text, VGA G, Video7 G	80×50	8×8	640×400	16 / CTEXT, 256K / LINEAR, 256 / LINEAR8	Video7 V-RAM VGA, WD90C, Diamond Speedstar 24X
38, 67, 82, 264	0026h, 0043h, 0052h, 0108h	Video7 Text, VGA G	80×60	8×8	640×480	16 / CTEXT, 256K / LINEAR	Tseng Labs EVA, Tseng ET3000/4000, VEGA VGA, Trident TVGA 8800/8900, Video7 V-RAM VGA, VESA-compatible Super VGA
35, 20, 23, 27, 39, 65, 2369, 265	0023h, 0014h, 0017h, 001Bh, 0027h, 0041h, 0941h, 0109h	VESA Text, VGA G	132×25	8×14, 9×14, 8×16, 8×8	1056×350, 1188×350, 1056×400, 1056×200	2 (mono) / MTEXT, 4 (gray) / TEXT, 16 / CTEXT, 256K / LINEAR	Tseng ET3000, Tseng ET4000, ATI EGA/VGA Wonder, Cirrus CL-GD5420/5422/5426, VESA-compatible Super VGA
29, 66, 84, 86, 266	001Dh, 0042h, 0054h, 0056h, 010Ah	VESA Text, VGA G	132×43	9×11, 8×9, 9×9	1188×473, 1056×387, 1188×387	16 / CTEXT, 256K / LINEAR	VESA-compatible Super VGA
34, 51, 99, 2370	0022h, 0033h, 0063h, 0942h	VESA Text	132×44	8×8, 9×8	1056×352, 1188×352	16 / CTEXT	Tseng Labs EVA, ATI EGA Wonder, ATI VIP, Genoa SuperEGA
81, 97, 105, 267	0051h, 0061h, 0069h, 010Bh	VESA Text	132×50	8×8	1056×400	16 / CTEXT	MORSE VGA, Cirrus 5320, WD90C, VESA-compatible Super VGA
33, 82, 30, 268	0021h, 0052h, 001Eh, 010Ch	VESA Text	132×60	8×8, 9×8	1056×480, 1188×480	16 / CTEXT	Tseng ET4000, MORSE VGA, Realtek RTVGA, VESA-compatible Super VGA
47	002Fh	Video7 Text, VGA G	160×50	8×8, .	1280×400, 720×512	16 / CTEXT, 256 / LINEAR8	Ahead B (Wizard/3270), VEGA VGA, Genoa
68, 2372	0044h, 0944h	Video7 Text	100×60	8×8	800×480	16 / CTEXT	Video7 V-RAM VGA, VEGA VGA, Tatung VGA

VGA and compatible cards support MDA, CGA and EGA modes. All colored modes have the same design of text attributes. MDA modes have some specific features (see above) – a text could be emphasized with bright, underline, reverse and blinking attributes.

The most common text mode used in DOS environments and initial Windows consoles is the default 80 columns by 25 rows, or 80×25, with 16 colors and 8×16 pixels large characters. VGA cards always have a built-in font of this size whereas other sizes may require downloading a differently sized font. This mode was available on practically all IBM and compatible personal computers.

Linux kernel 2.6 and later assumes that modes from 0000h to 00FFh represent standard modes if the VGA BIOS supports those, and that modes from 0100h to 07FFh represent VESA modes if the VESA BIOS supports them. Modes from 0900h to 09FFh are Video7 special modes (usually 0940h=80×43, 0941h=132×25, 0942h=132×44, 0943h=80×60, 0944h=100×60, 0945h=132×28 for the typical Video7 BIOS). Linux 2.x allows to check supported video resolutions by passing the argument "vga=ask".

Later versions of Linux allow to specify the resolution using modes from 1000h to 7FFFh. The code has a "0xHHWW" form where HH is a number of rows and WW is a number of columns. E.g. 0x1950 corresponds to an 80×25 mode, 0x2b84 to 132×43, etc. (Linux 3.x and later allow to set resolution using "video=<conn>:<xres>x<yres>", but solely for video framebuffer drivers.)

Two other VGA text modes, 80×43 and 80×50, exist but are less common. Windows NT 4.0 displayed its system messages during the boot process in 80×50 text mode.

Character sizes and graphical resolutions for the extended VESA-compatible Super VGA text modes are manufacturer-dependent. Some cards, e.g. S3, supported some very large custom text modes, like 132×43 and 132×25. Some graphic adapters of the 2000s were capable of setting up an arbitrarily-sized text mode (in reasonable limits) instead of choosing its parameters from some list.

=== SVGATextMode ===
On Linux and DOS systems with so-named SVGA cards, a program called SVGATextMode can be used to set up better looking text modes than EGA and VGA standard ones. This is particularly useful for large (≥ 17") monitors, where the normal 80×25 VGA text mode's 720×400 pixel resolution is far lower than a typical graphics mode would be. SVGATextMode allows setting of the pixel clock and higher refresh rate, larger font size, cursor size, etc., and allows a better use of the potential of a video card and monitor. In non-Windows systems, the use of SVGATextMode (or alternative options such as the Linux framebuffer) to obtain a sharp text is critical for LCD monitors of 1280×1024 (or higher resolution) because none of the standard text mode resolutions fits this matrix size exactly (and there would be upscaling artifacts). SVGATextMode also allows a fine tuning of video signal timings.

Despite the name of this program, only a few of its supported modes conform to SVGA (i.e. VESA) standards.

== General restrictions ==
VGA text mode has some hardware-imposed limitations. Because these are too restrictive for modern (post 2000) applications, the hardware text mode on VGA compatible video adapters only has a limited use.

Parameter	Original VGA	Modern video adapters	Remarks
Character cell (glyph) width	8 or 9 dots	≤ 9 dots	Not all hardware support glyphs narrower than 8 dots.
Character cell (glyph) height	≤ 32 dots		Not all hardware support glyphs narrower than 8 dots.
Number of character cells	At least 4,000 (reached at 80×50)	≤ 16,384 = 2^{14} (memory addressing limitations)	A modern adapter, if it supports non-standard modes, may produce a reasonably dense text screen even on a large monitor.
Width in character cells (characters per line)	At least 80	≤ 256(?)	A modern adapter, if it supports non-standard modes, may produce a reasonably dense text screen even on a large monitor.
Height in character cells (number of lines)	At least 50 (reached at 80×50)	≤ 256(?)	A modern adapter, if it supports non-standard modes, may produce a reasonably dense text screen even on a large monitor.
Code page size (number of different glyphs displayed simultaneously)	≤ 512 = 2^{9} (if font A ≠ font B)		Even 512 is insufficient for comprehensive Unicode support.
Code page size (number of different glyphs displayed simultaneously)	≤ 256 = 2^{8} (if font A = font B)		Even 512 is insufficient for comprehensive Unicode support.
Number of colors	foreground: 16^{*} background: 8 or 16^{**}		16 of arbitrarily chosen colors, not fixed.

^{*} 8 colors may be used by font A and other 8 colors by font B; so, if font A ≠ font B (512 characters mode), then the palette should be halved and a text may effectively use only 8 colors.
^{**} Normally, first 8 colors of the same palette. If blink is disabled, then all 16 colors are available for background.

For this reason, most modern UEFI boot loaders choose not to utilise VGA text mode; UEFI and any operating systems designed for it tend to use the Graphics Output Protocol (GOP) instead. In order to display text, modern boot loaders and operating systems that utilise GOP use UEFI Simple Text Output Protocol and UEFI Simple Font Protocol.

== See also ==
- General article about text mode of computer display
