= INT 16H =

BIOS interrupt call

INT 16h, INT 0x16, INT 16H or INT 22 is shorthand for BIOS interrupt call 16hex, the 23rd interrupt vector in an x86-based computer system. The BIOS typically sets up a real mode interrupt handler at this vector that provides keyboard services. This interrupt is responsible for control of the PC keyboard.

== Features ==
This interrupt is responsible for obtaining basic keyboard functionality, i.e. is responsible for collecting the keystrokes, obtain the status of the buffer of keyboard, etc. The standard encoding of the keyboard that offers the INT 16h is a US keyboard. To adapt the coding of the INT 16h to another type of keyboard (for example, an international keyboard), the code must analyze the scan-code of the key pressed, and then perform suitable interpreting.

For keyboards with 101 letters or more, there are some keys that INT 16h interprets as expanded keys, which have a scan-code that is different from normal keys (e.g., key pause).

== List of services of the INT 16 h ==
Function	Function code(AH)	Device
Read key press	00h	Keyboard
Get the State of the keyboard buffer	01h	Keyboard
Get the State of the keyboard	02h	Keyboard
Establish repetition factor	03h	Keyboard
Keyboard Click adjustment	04h	Keyboard
Simulate a keystroke	05h	Keyboard
Get the ID of the keyboard	0Ah	Keyboard
Read expanded keyboard character	10h	Expanded keyboard
Obtain status of the expanded keyboard buffer	11h	Expanded keyboard
Get expanded keyboard status	12h	Expanded keyboard

== INT 16h Detailed Function List ==
Function	Function code(AH)	Device	Inputs	Return	
Read key press	0h	Keyboard	None	AH = Scan code of the key pressed down	AL = ASCII character of the button pressed
Get the State of the keyboard buffer	1h	Keyboard	None	AH = Scan code, ZF = 0 if key pressed down	AL = ASCII character, AX = 0 if no Scan codes
Get the State of the keyboard	2h	Keyboard	None	AH = BIOS Keyboard flags	
Establish repetition factor	3h	Keyboard	AL = Mode, BH = Repeat delay (if AL = 5), BL = Typematic rate	None	
Keyboard Click adjustment	4h	Keyboard	AL = 0 (off) or 1 (on)	None	
Simulate a keystroke	5h	Keyboard	CH = Scan code, CL = ASCII Character	AL = 0 If successful, 1 otherwise	
Get the ID of the keyboard	Ah	Keyboard	None	AL = Keyboard Id	

== See also ==
- BIOS
- PS/2 port
