= Video BIOS =

BIOS for graphics cards

Generic components of a graphics card. Note that the VGABIOS is a separate chip located on the graphics card, and not part of the GPU.

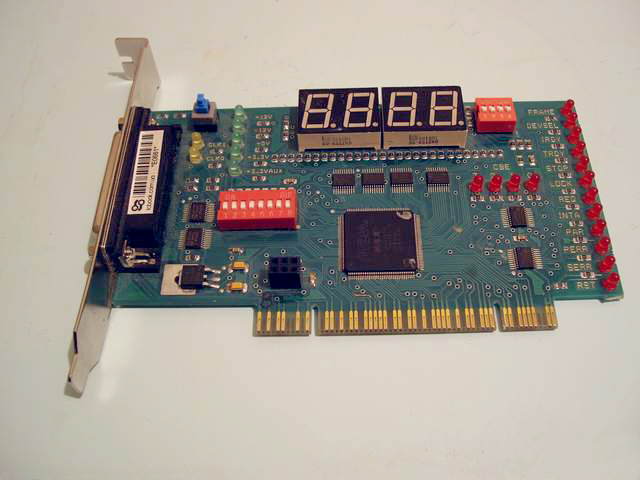
Practically all processing units require basic initialization, not just GPUs.

Video BIOS is the BIOS of a graphics card in a (usually IBM PC-derived) computer. It initializes the graphics card at the computer's boot time. It also implements INT 10h interrupt and VESA BIOS Extensions (VBE) for basic text and videomode output before a specific video driver is loaded. In UEFI 2.x systems, the INT 10h and the VBE are replaced by the UEFI GOP.

Much the way the system BIOS provides a set of functions that are used by software programs to access the system hardware, the video BIOS provides a set of video-related functions that are used by programs to access the video hardware, as well as storing video card settings such as card name, clock frequencies, VRAM types & voltages, and on-card VRM powers. The video BIOS interfaces software to the video chipset in the same way that the system BIOS does for the system chipset. The ROM also contained a basic font set to upload to the video adapter font RAM, if the video card did not contain a font ROM with this font set instead.

Unlike some other hardware components, the video card usually needs to be active very early during the boot process so that the user can see what is going on. This requires the card to be activated before any operating system begins loading; thus it needs to be activated by the BIOS, the only software that is present at this early stage. The system BIOS loads the video BIOS from the card's ROM into system RAM and transfers control to it early in the boot sequence.

Early PCs contained functions for driving MDA and CGA cards in the system BIOS, and those cards did not have any Video BIOS built in. When the EGA card was first sold in 1984, the Video BIOS was introduced to make these cards compatible with existing PCs whose BIOS did not know how to drive an EGA card. Ever since, EGA/VGA and all enhanced VGA compatible cards have included a Video BIOS.

When the computer is started, some graphics cards (usually certain Nvidia cards) display their vendor, model, Video BIOS version and amount of video memory.

== Modding ==
Up until the mid-2010s, video ROMs were user-editable/modifiable, which allowed users to configure GPU features like core clocks, VRAM clocks or fan speed curves, or even display a custom message on computer boot. In certain cases, a different GPU class could have been unlocked (the most famous example being the AMD Radeon HD6950 and HD6970 series who shared the same GPU, with some shading units disabled through the BIOS on the former. These units could be unlocked by replacing the original HD6950 BIOS with an HD6970 BIOS. The card would then behave as an actual HD6970). However, nowadays both NVIDIA and AMD required OEM/ODM to digitally sign the video firmware, which has made it impossible to make any changes to it. OEM/ODM can OTP fuses its public key to the GPU, makes GPU refused to load modded video firmware.

Older NVIDIA GPU ROMs up until the GeForce 900 series could be edited using NiBiTor (NVIDIA BIOS Editor).

== See also ==
- Graphics processing unit (GPU)
- VESA BIOS Extensions (VBE)
- Video Graphics Array (VGA)
