= VESA BIOS Extensions =

Video board software standard

VESA BIOS Extensions (VBE) is a VESA standard, currently at version 3, that defines the interface that can be used by software to access compliant video boards at high resolutions and bit depths. This is opposed to the "traditional" INT 10h BIOS calls, which are limited to resolutions of 640×480 pixels with 16 colour (4-bit) depth or less. VBE is made available through the video card's BIOS, which installs some interrupt vectors that point to itself during boot up.

Most newer cards implement the more capable VBE 3.0 standard. Older versions of VBE provide only a real mode interface, which cannot be used without a significant performance penalty from within protected mode operating systems. Consequently, the VBE standard has almost never been used for writing a video card's drivers; each vendor has thus had to invent a proprietary protocol for communicating with its own video card. Despite this, it is common that a driver thunk out to the real mode interrupt in order to initialize screen modes and gain direct access to a card's linear frame buffer, because these tasks would otherwise require handling many hundreds of proprietary variations that exist from card to card.

Like INT 10H, VBE provides x86 machine code; using its interfaces on other systems requires x86 emulation. In EFI 1.x systems, the INT 10H and the VESA BIOS Extensions (VBE) are replaced by the EFI UGA protocol. In widely used UEFI 2.x systems, the INT 10H and the VBE are replaced by the UEFI GOP.

== Standards ==
Initially, the need for standardization came from problems with accessing higher than standard VGA resolutions and color-depth modes on Super VGA graphic cards. Using those modes with cards produced by different manufacturers required drivers, which were available only for a few programs (mainly AutoCAD and Windows), while majority of the software was still for MS-DOS. The VBE allowed developers of MS-DOS real-mode applications to use the new graphic modes in a common, standardized way.

=== Early VBE ===
VBE 1.0 (VS891001) was defined in 1989. VBE 1.1 (VS900602) was defined in 1990. VBE 1.2 (VS911022) was defined in 1991. These versions of VBE require real mode to work. VBE defines several new functions called through INT 10H. The function numbering start with AX=4F00, or (AH=4F, AL=00), for Function 00h. 00h to 05h were defined in VBE 1.0, 06h and 07h in 1.1, and 08h in 1.2.

=== VESA BIOS Extensions (VBE core) 2.0 (November 1994) ===
This standard provides the primary functionality of the VESA BIOS Extensions. It allows applications to determine the capabilities of the graphics card and set the display modes that are found. VBE 2.0 adds some new features above the prior VBE 1.2 standard including linear framebuffer access and protected mode banking. Some of the VBE Core 2.0 features include:

Linear framebuffer access
Enables direct framebuffer access in protected mode as one large area of memory instead of less efficient smaller chunks.
Protected mode banking
Allows access to the framebuffer from protected mode without "thunking" down to real mode. This is implemented using a new Function 0Ah, but gives access only to functions 5 (Display Window Control, to select which part of the framebuffer is accessible through the 64KB VGA memory window), 7 (Get/Set Display Start, to change the memory position of the upper-left pixel, thus allowing scrolling and the use of multiple video pages), and 9 (Get/Set Palette Data, to change the palette colors in indexed modes). Thus setting the graphics mode required either doing it before entering Protected Mode, or using mode V86 to be able to run the BIOS software from a Protected-Mode operating system.
Super VGA page flipping
Allows higher performance animation to provide for smooth animation for computer games and other high performance graphics programs.
Super VGA virtual screens
Allows software to set up virtual display resolutions, larger than the actual displayed resolution, and smoothly scroll or pan around the larger image.
High Color and TrueColor modes
Industry standard 16-bit and 24-bit graphics modes for resolutions from 320×200 up to 1600×1200.

=== VESA BIOS Extensions (VBE core) 3.0 (September 1998) ===
A superset of the VBE 2.0 standard. This standard adds refresh rate control, facilities for stereo glasses, improved multi-buffering and other functions to the VBE 2.0 standard.

Triple buffering
Allows high speed applications to perform multi-buffering with less screen flickering and without having to wait for the graphics controller.
Refresh rate control using GTF timings
This allows applications and operating system utilities to change the refresh rate in a standard way on all VBE 3.0 graphics controllers. Important for stereo applications, since when stereo is enabled, the user's effective refresh rate is cut in half.
Stereo page flipping
When viewing an application using stereo glasses, software needs to page flip twice as often as normal, because it needs to generate separate images for each eye. This new feature allows stereo compatible software to display properly.
Hardware stereo sync
Allows stereo software to determine if there is a connector for stereo glasses on the user's graphics card.

A new "Protected Mode Entry Point" was added as an alternative to Function 0Ah. This gives access to all the VBE functions, thus allowing things like changing the graphics mode or setting the logical scan line length from protected mode, which were not possible with the old Function 0Ah.

=== VBE/accelerator functions (VBE/AF) (August 1996) ===
VBE/AF provides a low-level, standard interface to common acceleration functions available on most hardware. Some of the functions defined in the standard are access to hardware cursors, Bit Block Transfers (Bit Blt), off screen sprites, hardware panning, drawing and other functions. It is defined to work under 32-bit protected mode. Despite the widespread adoption of VBE Core, very few devices support VBE/AF. The FreeBE/AF project implements free third-party VBE/AF drivers for certain graphics cards.

=== Supplemental specifications ===
Supplemental specifications provides device independent interface between application software and Super VGA hardware. Function numbers are assigned by VESA Software Standards Committee (SSC).

==== Power management extensions (PM) ====
DPMS is a hardware standard that allows graphics cards to communicate with DPMS-compliant monitors via a special signalling system that can be used with existing graphics controllers and monitor cables. This signalling system allows the graphics card to tell the monitor to go into a number of different power management or power saving states, which effectively allow the monitor to turn itself off when it is not in use.

==== Flat panel interface extensions (FP) ====
Allows access to special features in flat panel controllers.

==== Audio interface extensions (AI) ====
Provides standard to audio services. Version 1.00 of the VBE/AI specification defines three device classes: WAVE, MIDI, and VOLUME. Device types not covered:

- CDROM control: Covered by the Microsoft's CD-ROM Extensions.
- Effects processors: This class of device will be expanded in future version of the VBE/AI specification.

==== OEM extensions ====
Provides standard entry to vendor-specific extensions.

==== Display Data Channel (DDC) ====
The Display Data Channel or DDC is a digital connection between a computer display and a graphics adapter that allows the display to communicate its specifications to the adapter. The standard was created by VESA.

==== Serial Control Interface (SCI) ====
Provides hardware independent means for operating system and application to read and write data over I²C serial control interface.

== VBE mode numbers ==
Although mode number is a 16-bit value, the optional VBE mode numbers are 14 bits wide. Bit 15 is used by VGA BIOS as a flag to clear or preserve display memory. VBE defined mode numbers as follows:

Bit	Meaning
0–8	Mode numbers. If bit 8 is 1, it is a VESA defined VBE mode.
9-10	Reserved for expansion. Must be set to 0.
11	Refresh rate control Select. If set to 1, use user specified CRTC values for refresh rate, otherwise use BIOS default refresh rate.
12–13	Reserved for VBE/AF. Must be set to 0.
14	Linear/Flat Frame Buffer Select. If set to 1, use linear frame buffer, otherwise use banked frame buffer.
15	Preserve Display Memory Select. If set to 1, preserve display memory, otherwise clear display memory.

Starting in VBE/Core 2.0, VESA no longer defines new VESA mode numbers and no longer requires a device to implement the old numbers. To properly detect information of a screen mode, use Function 01h - Return VBE Mode Information.

Mode 81FFh is a special video mode designed to preserve current memory contents and give access to the entire video memory.

=== Modes defined by VESA ===
Beginning with the VBE 2.0 standard, no new modes will be defined by VESA, and old modes are no longer mandatory. The use of defined modes should be considered deprecated: modern video cards may or may not use these mode numbers (even though most do for backward compatibility), and modern software should not use them. The correct way for software to discover available display modes is to obtain a list of modes (using "Function 00h - Return VBE Controller Information") and then to check each mode (using "Function 01h: Return VBE Mode Information") until it finds the mode/s it requires.

Graphics modes	320×200	640×400	640×480	800×600	1024×768	1280×1024
16-color palette				258 (0102h), 106 (6Ah)	260 (0104h)	262 (0106h)
256-color palette		256 (0100h)	257 (0101h)	259 (0103h)	261 (0105h)	263 (0107h)
15-bit (5:5:5)	269 (010Dh)		272 (0110h)	275 (0113h)	278 (0116h)	281 (0119h)
16-bit (5:6:5)	270 (010Eh)		273 (0111h)	276 (0114h)	279 (0117h)	282 (011Ah)
24-bit (8:8:8)	271 (010Fh)		274 (0112h)	277 (0115h)	280 (0118h)	283 (011Bh)

Modes 264–268 are text modes. 264 (0108h) is 80 columns × 60 rows (80×60), 265 (0109h) is 132×25, 266 (010Ah) is 132×43, 267 (010Bh) is 132×50 and 268 (010Ch) is 132×60.

Text modes	Columns	
Rows	80	132
25		265 (0109h)
43		266 (010Ah)
50		267 (010Bh)
60	264 (0108h)	268 (010Ch)

=== Other commonly available graphics modes ===
The table below combines the modes defined by VESA (the values denoted in black) along with modes commonly used, but which may not work on all graphics cards as they are not defined by any standard (denoted in red and marked with an X).

Graphics modes	320×200	640×400	640×480	✘800×500	800×600	✘896×672	✘1024×640	1024×768	✘1152×720	1280×1024	✘1360×768	✘1440×900	✘1600×1200
16-color palette					258 (0102h), 106 (6Ah)			260 (0104h)		262 (0106h)			
256-color palette		256 (0100h)	257 (0101h)	✘367 (016Fh)	259 (0103h)	✘303 (012Fh)	✘362 (016Ah)	261 (0105h)	✘357 (0165h)	263 (0107h)		✘352 (0160h)	✘284 (011Ch)
15-bit (5:5:5)	269 (010Dh)	✘289 (0121h)	272 (0110h)	✘368 (0170h)	275 (0113h)	✘304 (0130h)	✘363 (016Bh)	278 (0116h)	✘358 (0166h)	281 (0119h)		✘353 (0161h)	✘285 (011Dh)
16-bit (5:6:5)	270 (010Eh)	✘290 (0122h)	273 (0111h)	✘369 (0171h)	276 (0114h)	✘305 (0131h)	✘364 (016Ch)	279 (0117h)	✘359 (0167h)	282 (011Ah)	✘978 (03d2h)	✘354 (0162h)	✘286 (011Eh)
24-bit (8:8:8)	271 (010Fh)	✘291 (0123h)	274 (0112h)	✘370 (0172h)	277 (0115h)	✘306 (0132h)	✘365 (016Dh)	280 (0118h)	✘360 (0168h)	283 (011Bh)		✘355 (0163h)	✘287 (011Fh)
✘32-bit (8:8:8)		✘292 (0124h)	✘297 (0129h)	✘371 (0173h)	✘302 (012Eh)	✘307 (0133h)	✘366 (016Eh)	✘312 (0138h)	✘361 (0169h)	✘317 (013Dh)	✘980 (03d4h)	✘356 (0164h)	✘322 (0142h)

=== Mode detection ===
A few tools have been written to detect VBE modes available on a system. They generally work by invoking Function 01h, which is more reliable than assuming a table of extended modes as it's part of the device's self-documentation.

- hwinfo is the hardware detection tool used in SuSE Linux and in some other Linux distributions. Running hwinfo --framebuffer reports graphics information, including VESA modes on a "Mode" line.
- mdt is a Linux or DOS tool that uses VESA BIOS functions to read monitor data.
- The Linux Real Mode Interface (LRMI) has a vbetest program that prints out VESA info.
- SciTech Software had a unrelated vbetest for DOS that dates back to 1994.
- The x86 "PC" version GNU GRUB 2 has a vbeinfo command for printing out available video modes and vbetest for trying a specific mode. They use a built-in table instead of Function 01h. For other platforms, including x86 EFI, they are replaced by the more generic videoinfo and videotest.

=== Linux video mode numbers ===
The Linux kernel allows the user to select the VESA mode at boot time by passing a code in memory to the kernel. The LILO boot loader passes this code based on a "vga" parameter in its configuration file. It takes the form 'vga=XXX', where XXX is the decimal value, or 'vga=0xHHH', where HHH is the hexadecimal value. However, the 'vga=' boot loader parameter does not directly accept VESA video mode numbers; rather, the Linux video mode number is the VESA number plus 512 (in the case of the decimal representation) or plus 0x200 (in the case of the hexadecimal representation). For example, the defined VESA value of 257 (0x101), representing 640x480 and 256 colours, has an equivalent Linux video mode value of 769 (0x301).

As indicated earlier, the VESA standard defines a limited set of modes; in particular, none above 1280×1024 are covered and, instead, their implementation is completely optional for graphics adapter manufacturers. As vendors are free to utilize whatever additional values they please, this means that, in the table below, the modes denoted in red (and expressed in decimal form) may not apply to every graphics adapter!

	320×200	640×400	640×480	800×500	800×600	896×672	1024×640	1024×768	1152×720	1280×1,024	1400×1,050	1440×900	1600×1,200	1920×1080	1920×1200
16 colors					770 0302h			772 0304h		774 0306h					
256 colors		768 0300h	769 0301h	879 036Fh	771 0303h	815 032Fh	874 036Ah	773 0305h	869	775 0307h	835	864	796		893
15-bit (5:5:5)	781 030Dh	801 0321h	784 0310h	880 0370h	787 0313h	816 0330h	875 036Bh	790 0316h	870	793 0319h		865	797		
16-bit (5:6:5)	782 030Eh	802 0322h	785 0311h	881 0371h	788 0314h	817 0331h	876 036Ch	791 0317h	871	794 031Ah	837	866	798		
24-bit (8:8:8)	783 030Fh	803 0323h	786 0312h	882 0372h	789 0315h	818 0332h	877 036Dh	792 0318h	872	795 031Bh	838	867	799		
32-bit (8:8:8)^{1}		804	809	883	814	819	878	824	873	829		868	834	980; 03D4h	

1: 32-bit is really (8:8:8:8), but the final 8-bit number is an "empty" alpha channel. It is otherwise equal to 24-bit colour. Many GPUs use 32-bit colour mode instead of 24-bit mode merely for faster video memory access through 32-bit memory alignment.

VGA=864 [ 352 (0160h)] also appears to select 1280×800 (8-bit) for various laptops' displays.
VGA=834 [ 322 (0142h)] is 1400×1050

=== Modes available in Parallels ===
The VESA BIOS emulation in the Parallels virtual machine has a different set of non-standard VESA modes. As of build 3214, LRMI vbetest reveals these modes:

	640×400	640×480	720×480	800×500	800×600	896×672	1024×640	1024×768	1152×720	1280×1,024	1440×900	1600×1,200
256 color palette	256 (0100h)	257 (0101h)	367 (016Fh)	364 (016Ch)	259 (0103h)	297 (0129h)	358 (0166h)	261 (0105h)	355 (0163h)	263 (0107h)	352 (0160h)	284 (011Ch)
15-bit (5:5:5)		272 (0110h)			275 (0113h)			278 (0116h)		281 (0119h)		285 (011Dh)
16-bit (5:6:5)	289 (0121h)	273 (0111h)	368 (0170h)	365 (016Dh)	276 (0114h)	298 (012Ah)	359 (0167h)	279 (0117h)	356 (0164h)	282 (011Ah)	353 (0161h)	286 (011Eh)
24-bit (8:8:8)	290 (0122h)	274 (0112h)	369 (0171h)	366 (016Eh)	277 (0115h)	299 (012Bh)	360 (0168h)	280 (0118h)	357 (0165h)	283 (011Bh)	354 (0162h)	287 (011Fh)

=== Modes available in VirtualBox ===
The VESA BIOS emulation in the VirtualBox virtual machine has a different set of non-standard VESA modes. As of 6.1.38_Ubuntu build r153438, the VESA BIOS function AX=0x4F01 reveals these modes (See also VBETables-gen.c):

	320x200	640×400	640×480	800×600	1024×768	1152×864	1280×1024	1600×1200
4-bit palette					260 (0104h)		262 (0106h)	
256 color palette	326 (0146h)	256 (0100h)	257 (0101h)	259 (0103h)	261 (0105h)	328 (0148h)	263 (0107h)	
15-bit (5:5:5)	269 (010dh)		272 (0110h)	275 (0113h)	278 (0116h)	329 (0149h)	281 (0119h)	
16-bit (5:6:5)	270 (010eh)		273 (0111h)	276 (0114h)	279 (0117h)	330 (014ah)	282 (011Ah)	
24-bit (8:8:8)	271 (010fh)		274 (0112h)	277 (0115h)	280 (0118h)	331 (014bh)	283 (011Bh)	
32-bit (x:8:8:8)	320 (0140h)	321 (0141h)	322 (0142h)	323 (0143h)	324 (0144h)	332 (014ch)	325 (0145h)	327 (0147h)

In addition to these, users can specify their own video modes.

== See also ==
- nouveau (software)
- UniVBE
