= Intel AMT versions =

Versions of Intel Active Management Technology

Intel Active Management Technology (AMT) is hardware-based technology built into PCs with Intel vPro technology. AMT is designed to help sys-admins remotely manage PCs out-of-band when PC power is off, the operating system (OS) is unavailable (hung, crashed, corrupted, missing), software management agents are missing, or hardware (such as a hard disk drive or memory) has failed.

== Versions ==
Intel AMT is built into a small secondary processor located on the motherboard. This OOB controller has embedded firmware that runs on the Manageability Engine (ME), a separate small processor built into the northbridge (or network card for AMT 1.0) of the motherboard. The AMT firmware is stored in the same SPI flash memory component used to store the BIOS and is generally updated along with the BIOS. FWH (Firmware Hub) or LPC firmware storage is not supported for AMT.

In general, an AMT version can be updated in software to the next minor version. New major releases of Intel AMT are built into a new chipset, and are updated through new hardware.

- Intel AMT 1.0 — Intel platforms based on the Intel 82573E (Tekoa; usually 945, ICH7) Gigabit Ethernet Controller, e.g., the Intel D975XBX2 motherboard. This version provides basic NVRAM, hardware asset, event log and other basic features. It does not provide Intel System Defense network filters.
- Intel AMT 2.0 (2007) — Intel vPro desktop platforms based on the Intel Q963/Q965 (Broadwater-Q, ICH8) chipsets, e.g., the Intel DQ965GF motherboard.
- Intel AMT 2.1 — Intel AMT 2.0 + AMT Power Savings (Intel Management Engine Wake on LAN) and bug fixes (supported on same platforms as Intel AMT 2.0).
- Intel AMT 2.2 — Intel AMT 2.1 + Remote Configuration and bug fixes (supported on same platforms as Intel AMT 2.1 and Intel AMT 2.0).
- Intel AMT 2.5 — Intel Centrino Pro mobile platforms based on the GM965/PM965 (Santa Rosa: Crestline, ICH8M) chipsets.
- Intel AMT 2.6 — Intel AMT 2.5 + Remote Configuration and bug fixes (supported on same platforms as Intel AMT 2.5).
- Intel AMT 3.0 — Intel vPro desktop platforms based on the Intel Q35 (Weybridge: Bearlake-Q, ICH9) chipsets, e.g., the Intel DQ35MP motherboard.
- Intel AMT 3.1 — Intel AMT 3.0 + Linux (Red Hat and SUSE) support (supported on same desktop platforms as Intel AMT 3.0; uses same firmware).
- Intel AMT 3.2 — Intel AMT 3.0 + extra DASH 1.0 (simplified configuration) support and bug fixes (supported on same desktop platforms as Intel AMT 3.1 and Intel AMT 3.0).
- Intel AMT 4.0 — Mobile platforms with Intel Centrino 2 with vPro based on the GM45 or 47/PM45 (Montevina: Cantiga, ICH9M) chipsets.
- Intel AMT 4.1 — Intel AMT 4.0 + Intel Anti-Theft Technology. Supported on same mobile platforms as Intel AMT 4.0, and based on the GM45 (Montevina, ICH9M) chipset.
- Intel AMT 5.0 — Intel Core 2 vPro desktop platforms (launched September 22, 2008) based on the Intel Q45 (McCreary: Eaglelake-Q, ICH10) chipsets.
- Intel AMT 6.0 — Intel Core i5/7 vPro desktop platforms based on the Q57 (Piketon: Ibex Peak) chipset, Core i5/7 vPro mobile platforms based on the QM57 and QS57 (Calpella: Ibex Peak) chipset, and Xeon 3400 series/Core i5 vPro entry workstation platforms based on the 3450 chipset.
- Intel AMT 7.0 — Intel Q67 (Sugar Bay: Cougar Point) chipset, mobile QM67 and QS67 (Huron River: Cougar Point) chipset.
- Intel AMT 8.0 — Intel Q75 and Q77 (Maho Bay: Panther Point) chipset, mobile QM77 and QS77 (Chief River: Panther Point) chipset.
- Intel AMT 9.0 — Intel Q87 chipset, mobile QM87 chipset (Lynx Point). SOAP(EOI) protocol removed.
- Intel AMT 10.0 — Intel Q97 chipset, SoC only.
- Intel AMT 11.0 — Intel Q170, Q150, С232, CM236, C236 chipsets.
- Intel AMT 11.5 — Intel Q270, CM238, CM248 chipsets.
- Intel AMT 12.0 — Intel Q370 chipset.
- Intel AMT 14.0 — Intel Q470 and W480 chipsets.
- Intel AMT 15.0 — Intel Q570 and W580 chipsets.
- Intel AMT 16.0 — Intel Q670 and W680 chipset.

=== Comparison of AMT versions ===
The following is a comparison of the various features supported by each version of Intel AMT

Feature	AMT version											
Feature	AMT 1.0 (Desktop)	AMT 2.0/2.1 (Desktop)	AMT 2.5/2.6 (Mobile)	AMT 3.0 (Desktop)	AMT 4.0 (Mobile)	AMT 5.0 (Desktop)	6.0 (Desktop & Mobile)	7.0 & 8.0 (Desktop & Mobile)	9.0 (Desktop & Mobile)	10.0 (Desktop & Mobile)	11.0 (Desktop & Mobile)	12.0 (Desktop & Mobile)
Hardware Inventory	Yes	Yes	Yes	Yes	Yes	Yes	Yes	Yes	Yes	Yes	Yes	Yes
Persistent ID	Yes	Yes	Yes	Yes	Yes	Yes	Yes	Yes	Yes	Yes	Yes	Yes
Remote Power On/Off	Yes	Yes	Yes	Yes	Yes	Yes	Yes	Yes	Yes	Yes	Yes	Yes
SOL/IDE redirect	Yes	Yes	Yes	Yes	Yes	Yes	Yes	Yes	Yes	Yes	Yes	Yes
Event Management	Yes	Yes	Yes	Yes	Yes	Yes	Yes	Yes	Yes	Yes	Yes	Yes
Third-party Data Storage	Yes	Yes	Yes	Yes	Yes	Yes	Yes	Yes	Yes	Yes	Yes	Yes
Built-in web server	Yes	Yes	Yes	Yes	Yes	Yes	Yes	Yes	Yes	Yes	Yes	Yes
Flash Protection	Yes	Yes	Yes	Yes	Yes	Yes	Yes	Yes	Yes	Yes	Yes	Yes
Firmware Update	Yes	Yes	Yes	Yes	Yes	Yes	Yes	Yes	Yes	Yes	Yes	Yes
TCP/IP, SOAP XML/EOI	Yes	Yes	Yes	Yes	Yes	Yes	Yes	No	No	No	No	No
HTTP Digest/TLSv1.0	Yes	Yes	Yes	Yes	Yes	Yes	Yes	Yes	Yes	Yes	Yes	No
HTTP Digest/TLSv1.1	Yes	Yes	Yes	Yes	Yes	Yes	Yes	Yes	Yes	Yes	Yes	Yes
HTTP Digest/TLSv1.2	No	No	No	No	No	No	No	No	No	No	No	Yes
Static and dynamic IP	Yes	Yes	Yes	Yes	Yes	Yes	Yes	Yes	Yes	Yes	Yes	Yes
System Defense	No	Yes	Yes	Yes	Yes	Yes	Yes	Yes	Yes	Yes	Yes	Yes
Agent Presence	No	Yes	Yes	Yes	Yes	Yes	Yes	Yes	Yes	Yes	Yes	Yes
Power Policies	No	Yes	Yes	Yes	Yes	Yes	Yes	Yes	Yes	Yes	Yes	Yes
Mutual Authentication	No	Yes	Yes	Yes	Yes	Yes	Yes	Yes	Yes	Yes	Yes	Yes
Kerberos	No	Yes	Yes	Yes	Yes	Yes	Yes	Yes	Yes	Yes	Yes	Yes
TLS-PSK	No	Yes	Yes	Yes	Yes	Yes	Yes	Yes	Yes	Yes	Yes	Yes
Privacy Icon	No	2.1 and up	Yes	Yes	Yes	Yes	Yes	Yes	Yes	Yes	Yes	Yes
ME Wake-on-LAN	No	2.1 and up	Yes	Yes	Yes	Yes	Yes	Yes	Yes	Yes	Yes	Yes
Remote Configuration	No	2.2 and up	2.6 and up	Yes	Yes	Yes	Yes	Yes	Yes	Yes	Yes	Yes
Wireless Configuration	No	No	Yes	No	Yes	No	Yes	Yes	Yes	Yes	Yes	Yes
Endpoint Access Control (EAC) 802.1	No	No	Yes	Yes	Yes	Yes	Yes	Yes	Yes	Yes	Yes	Yes
Power Packages	No	No	Yes	No	Yes	No	Yes	Yes	Yes	Yes	Yes	Yes
Environment Detection	No	No	Yes	No	Yes	No	Yes	Yes	Yes	Yes	Yes	Yes
Event Log Reader Realm	No	No	2.6 and up	Yes	Yes	Yes	Yes	Yes	Yes	Yes	Yes	Yes
System Defense Heuristics	No	No	No	Yes	No	Yes	Yes	Yes	Yes	Yes	Yes	Yes
WS-Management interface	No	No	No	Yes	Yes	Yes	Yes	Yes	Yes	Yes	Yes	Yes
VLAN settings for Intel AMT network interfaces	No	No	No	Yes	No	Yes	No	Yes	Yes	Yes	Yes	Yes
Fast Call For Help (CIRA)	No	No	No	No	Yes	Yes	Yes	Yes	Yes	Yes	Yes	Yes
Access Monitor	No	No	No	No	Yes	Yes	Yes	Yes	Yes	Yes	Yes	Yes
MS NAP support	No	No	No	No	Yes	Yes	Yes	Yes	Yes	Yes	Yes	Yes
Virtualization Support for Agent Presence	No	No	No	No	No	Yes	Yes	Yes	Yes	Yes	Yes	Yes
PC Alarm Clock	No	No	No	No	No	5.1 and up	Yes	Yes	Yes	Yes	Yes	Yes
KVM Remote Control	No	No	No	No	No	No	Yes	Yes	Yes	Yes	Yes	Yes
Wireless Profile Synchronization	No	No	No	No	No	No	Yes	Yes	Yes	Yes	Yes	Yes
Support for IPv6	No	No	No	No	No	No	Yes	Yes	Yes	Yes	Yes	Yes
Host-based Provisioning	No	No	No	No	No	No	6.1 and up	Yes	Yes	Yes	Yes	Yes
Host-based over the Internet Provisioning	No	No	No	No	Yes	Yes	Yes	Yes	Yes	Yes	Yes	Yes
Zero-touch over the Internet Provisioning	No	No	No	No	Yes	Yes	Yes	Yes	Yes	Yes	Yes	Yes
Graceful Shutdown	No	No	No	No	No	No	No	No	Yes	Yes	Yes	Yes
Screen blanking	No	No	No	No	No	No	No	No	No	Yes	Yes	Yes
Graceful power operations	No	No	No	No	No	No	No	No	No	Yes	Yes	Yes
Secure erasure of storage nodes	No	No	No	No	No	No	No	No	No	No	Yes	Yes
Feature	AMT 1.0 (Desktop)	AMT 2.0/2.1 (Desktop)	AMT 2.5/2.6 (Mobile)	AMT 3.0 (Desktop)	AMT 4.0 (Mobile)	AMT 5.0 (Desktop)	6.0 (Desktop & Mobile)	7.0 & 8.0 (Desktop & Mobile)	9.0 (Desktop & Mobile)	10.0 (Desktop & Mobile)	11.0 (Desktop & Mobile)	12.0 (Desktop & Mobile)
Feature	AMT version											

== See also ==
- Host Embedded Controller Interface (HECI)
- Alert Standard Format (ASF)
- Distributed Management Task Force (DMTF)
- Intelligent Platform Management Interface (IPMI)
- Baseboard management controller (BMC)
- Trusted Platform Module (TPM)
- I/O Controller Hub (ICH)
- Platform Controller Hub (PCH)
- Out-of-band management (OOBM)
