= Librem =

Computer line by Purism featuring free software

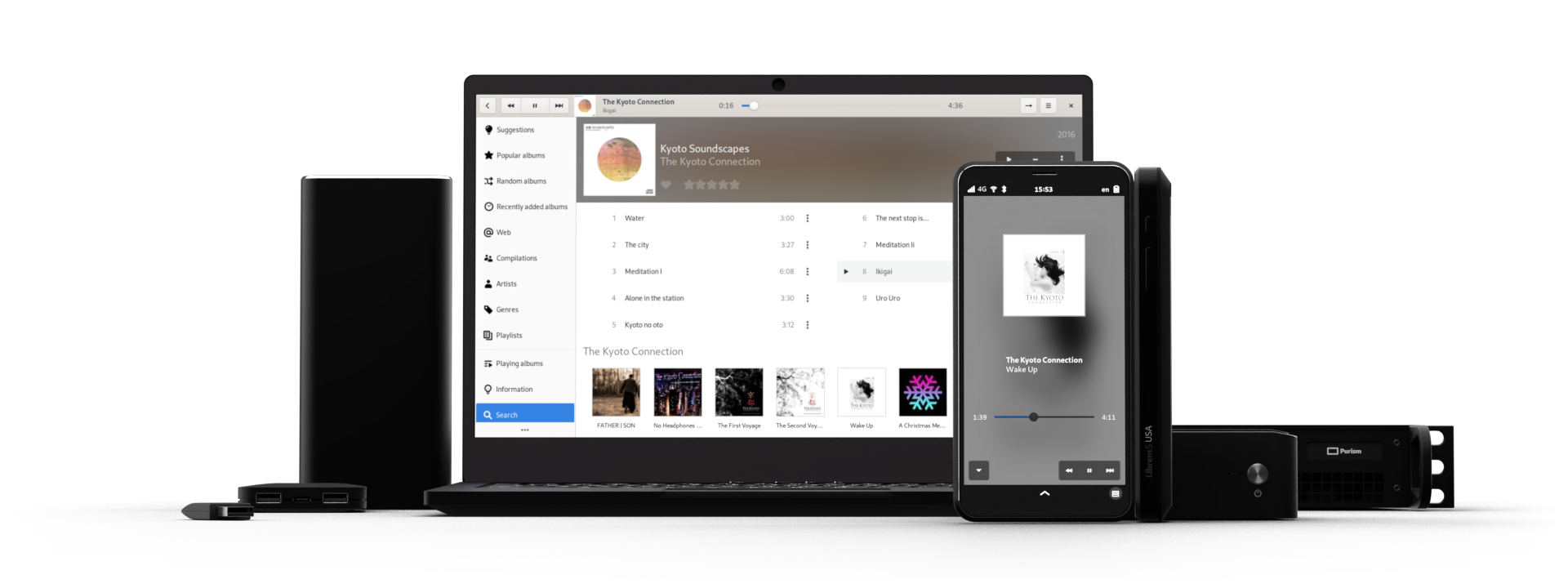
- Developer: Purism
- Manufacturer: Purism
- Type: Laptop–netbook, desktop, smartphone, server
- Released: 2014; 12 years ago
- Operating system: PureOS, QubesOS
- CPU: Intel Core
- Graphics: Intel HD Graphics
- Marketing target: Computer security purpose
- Website: puri.sm

Librem is a line of computers manufactured by Purism, SPC featuring free (libre) software. The laptop line is designed to protect privacy and freedom by omitting non-free (proprietary) software in their operating system and kernel, avoiding the Intel Active Management Technology, and gradually freeing and securing firmware. Librem laptops feature hardware kill switches for the microphone, webcam, Bluetooth and Wi-Fi.

== Models ==
=== Laptops ===
==== Librem 13, Librem 15 and Librem 14 ====
In 2014, Purism launched a crowdfunding campaign on Crowd Supply to fund the creation and production of the Librem 15 laptop, conceived as a modern alternative to existing open-source hardware laptops, all of which used older hardware. The 15 in the name refers to its 15-inch screen size. The campaign succeeded after extending the original campaign, and the laptops were shipped to backers. In a second revision of the laptop, hardware kill switches for the camera, microphone, Wi-Fi, and Bluetooth were added.

After the successful launch of the Librem 15, Purism created another campaign on Crowd Supply for a 13-inch laptop named Librem 13, which also came with hardware kill switches similar to those on the Librem 15v2. The campaign was again successful and the laptops were shipped to customers.

Purism announced in December 2016 that it would start shipping from inventory rather than building to order with the new batches of Librem 15 and 13.

As of January 2023, Purism has one laptop model in production, the Librem 14.

==== Comparison of laptops ====
Librem model	Coreboot version	CPU	Intel ME	Release	Max RAM (GB)
16 v1	26.03 (2026)	Intel Core i7-13620H	Disabled	June 2026	64
15 v1	4.21 (2023)	Intel Core i7 5557U	Disabled	July 2015	32
13 v1	4.21 (2023)	Intel Core i5 5200U	Disabled	September 2015	16
15 v2	4.21 (2023)	Intel Core i7-5557U	Disabled	September 2015	32
13 v2	4.21 (2023)	Intel Core i5 6200U	Disabled	June 14, 2017	16
15 v3	4.21 (2023)	Intel Core i7 6500U	Disabled	June 28, 2017	32
13 v3	4.21 (2023)	Intel Core i7 6500U	Disabled	October 2017	16
15 v4	4.21 (2023)	Intel Core i7 7500U	Disabled	January 2019	32
13 v4	4.21 (2023)	Intel Core i7 7500U	Disabled	January 2019	16
14 v1	4.21 (2023)	Intel Core i7 10710U	Disabled	early Q4 2020	64

=== Librem Mini ===
The Librem Mini is a small form factor desktop computer, which began shipping in June 2020.

Librem model	Coreboot version	CPU	Intel ME	Release	Max RAM (GB)
Mini V1	4.21 (2023)	Intel Core i7-8565U	Disabled	March 2020	64
Mini V2	4.21 (2023)	Intel Core i7-10510U	Disabled	November 2020	64

=== Librem 5 ===
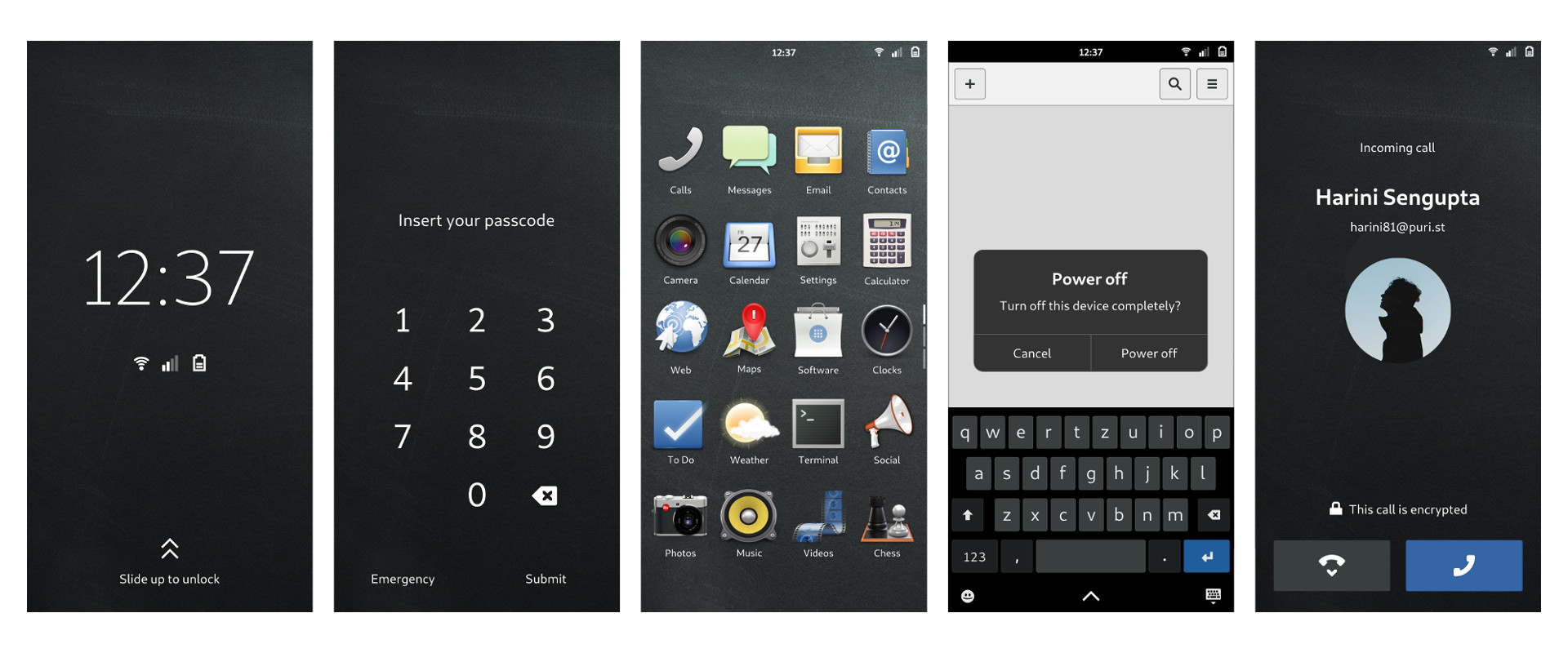
Phosh, the GNOME mobile shell that runs on the Librem 5.

On August 24, 2017, Purism began a crowdfunding campaign for the Librem 5, a smartphone aimed to run 100% free software, which would "[focus] on security by design and privacy protection by default". Purism claimed that the phone would become "the world's first ever IP-native mobile handset, using end-to-end encrypted decentralized communication." Purism cooperated with KDE and GNOME in its development of Librem 5.

Security features of the Librem 5 include separation of the CPU from the baseband processor, which, according to Linux Magazine, makes the Librem 5 unique in comparison to other mobile phones. The Librem 5 also features hardware kill switches for Wi-Fi and Bluetooth communication and the phone's camera, microphone, and baseband processor.

The default operating system for the Librem 5 is Purism's PureOS, a Debian derivative. The operating system uses a new user interface named Phosh, based on Wayland, wlroots, GTK and GNOME middleware. It is planned that Phosh/Plasma Mobile, Ubuntu Touch, and postmarketOS can also be installed on the phone.

The release of the Librem 5 has been postponed several times. In September 2018, Purism announced that the launch date of Librem 5 would be moved from January to April 2019, because of two hardware bugs and the holiday season in Europe and North America. The Librem 5's DevKits for software developers were shipped in December 2018. The launch date was later postponed to the third quarter because of the necessity of further CPU tests. On September 24, 2019, Purism announced that the first batch of Librem 5 phones had begun shipping. The finished version of the Librem 5, known as "Evergreen", was finally shipped on November 18, 2020.

=== Librem Server ===
The Librem server is a rack mounted server, released to the public in December 2019.

=== Librem Key ===
Announced on 20 September 2018, the Librem Key is a hardware USB security token with multiple features, including integration with a tamper-evident Heads BIOS, which ensures that the Librem laptop Basic Input/Output System (BIOS) was not maliciously altered since the last laptop launch. The Librem Key also features one-time password storage with 3x HMAC-based One-time Password algorithm (HOTP) (RFC 4226) and 15 x Time-based One-time Password algorithm (TOTP) (RFC 6238) and an integrated password manager (16 entries), 40 kbit/s true random number generator, and a tamper-resistant smart card. The key supports type A USB 2.0, has dimensions of 48 x 19 x 7 mm, and weighs 6 g.

== Operating system ==
Initially planning to preload its Librem laptops with the Trisquel operating system, Purism eventually moved off the Trisquel platform to Debian for the 2.0 release of its PureOS Linux operating system. As an alternative to PureOS, Librem laptops are purchasable with Qubes OS preinstalled. In December 2017, the Free Software Foundation added PureOS to its list of endorsed GNU/Linux distributions.

== BIOS ==
In 2015, Purism began research to port the Librem 13 to coreboot but the effort was initially stalled. By the end of the year, a coreboot developer completed an initial port of the Librem 13 and submitted it for review. In December 2016, hardware enablement developer Youness Alaoui joined Purism and was tasked to complete the coreboot port for the original Librem 13 and prepare a port for the second revision of the device. Since summer 2017, new Librem laptops are shipped with coreboot as their standard BIOS, and updates are available for all older models.

Purism calls a collection of these six components, involved in the boot process, as PureBoot:

1. Neutralized and disabled Intel Management Engine
2. coreboot
3. A Trusted Platform Module (TPM) chip
4. Heads, which has tamper-evident features to detect if the BIOS or important boot files have been modified
5. Librem Key, Purism's USB security token
6. Multi-factor authentication that unlocks disk encryption using the Librem Key

PureBoot protects the users from various attacks like theft, BIOS malware and kernel rootkits, vulnerabilities and malicious code in the Intel Management Engine, and interdiction.

== See also ==
- Linux adoption
- System76
- Pine64
- Coreboot
