= Flow management =

Flow management may refer to:

- Bandwidth management
- Network congestion
- Network traffic control
- People flow
- Traffic management
