= Lenovo ThinkPad X220 =

Laptop computer model

ThinkPad X220
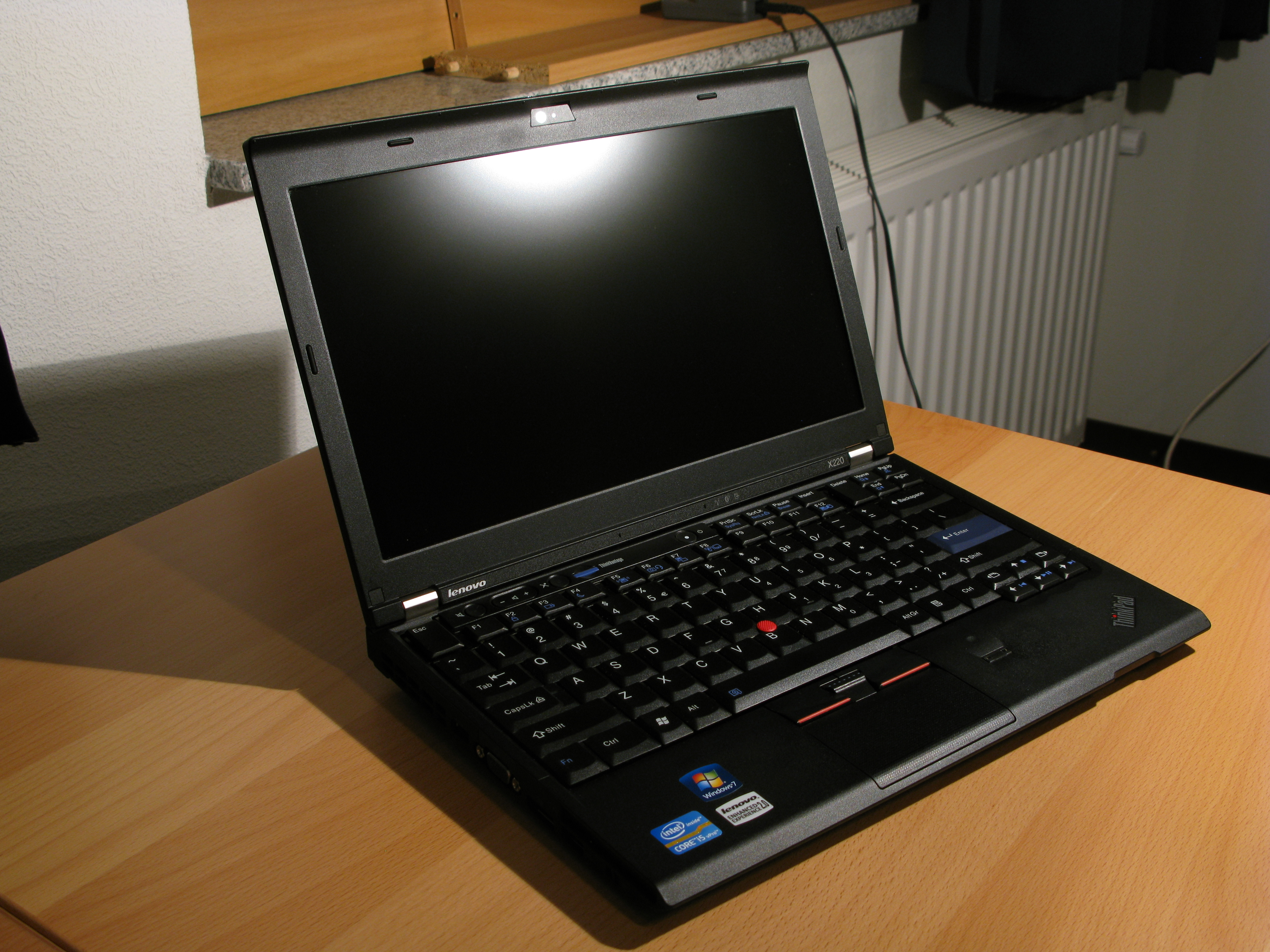
- Developer: Lenovo
- Product family: ThinkPad
- Type: Laptop
- CPU: Intel Core
- Predecessor: ThinkPad x201
- Successor: ThinkPad x230

The Lenovo ThinkPad X220 is a business laptop from the ThinkPad series that was manufactured by Lenovo.

The X220 was designed for mobile professionals, prioritizing portability without sacrificing the performance typically found in larger 14-inch laptops. It was the first in the X-series to move to a 12.5-inch 16:9 widescreen display, which could come in either TN or IPS configurations.

This model is known as the last ThinkPad X series to feature the traditional 7-row 'Classic' keyboard layout. Subsequent models, starting with the X230, transitioned to a 6-row island-style 'Chiclet' keyboard design.

A tablet version was also released.

== Common modifications ==
The keyboard from the X220 has been retrofitted in a X230.

Installation of custom BIOS firmware which removes the factory whitelist for Wi-Fi and WWAN cards, allowing for the installation of modern wireless cards, such as the Intel 7260AC. The X220 is a popular target for Coreboot, an open-source firmware replacement that allows for a cleaner boot process and increased security through the me_cleaner utility, neutralizing the Intel Management Engine.

The original Windows 7 operating system is often replaced by users in favor of a Linux based operating system.

The X220 is frequently upgraded with solid-state drives (SSD) to improve performance over the stock hard disk drives. A notable feature of the model's design is its support for two simultaneous internal storage drives: a full-size 7mm 2.5-inch SATA drive in the main bay and a secondary mSATA SSD in the internal Mini-PCIe slot (shared with the WWAN card). While the main bay supports SATA 3.0 speeds (6 Gb/s), the mSATA slot is limited to SATA 2.0 (3 Gb/s).

== Specifications ==
The ThinkPad X220 houses 2nd Generation Sandy Bridge Intel CPUs, the most common option being the I5 2520M.

Connectivity includes three USB 2.0 ports as standard on Core i3 and i5 models; however, Core i7 variants replace one of these with a single USB 3.0 port (identified by its blue plastic insert).

The X220 features two SO-DIMM slots. While Lenovo officially documented a maximum capacity of 8 GB of DDR3 RAM, independent testing has confirmed the system supports up to 16 GB. This discrepancy is attributed to the fact that 8 GB modules were not commercially available during the machine's initial testing phase.
