= CIRA =

CIRA may refer to:

- Canadian Internet Registration Authority
- Centre International de Recherches sur l'Anarchisme (CIRA), library of anarchist material in Lausanne, Switzerland
- Central Illinois Regional Airport, a public airport in McLean County, Illinois
- Centro Italiano Ricerche Aerospaziali, the Italian Aerospace Research Centre
- Client Initiated Remote Access, a remote access technology from Intel
- Comprehensive Immigration Reform Act, Senate Proposed Legislation, S. 2611
- Continuity Irish Republican Army
- Cooperative Institute for Research in the Atmosphere, Colorado State University
- Yale University Center for Interdisciplinary Research on AIDS (CIRA)
- CIRA, COSPAR international reference atmosphere, an empirical model of the upper atmosphere
- CIRA-FM, a French language Canadian radio station in Montreal, Quebec
