= Titanium (malware) =

Advanced backdoor advanced persistent threat, developed by PLATINUM

Malware details
- Classification: Computer trojan
- Author: PLATINUM

Titanium is a very advanced backdoor malware APT, developed by PLATINUM, a cybercrime collective. The malware was uncovered by Kaspersky Lab and reported on 8 November 2019. According to Global Security Mag, "Titanium APT includes a complex sequence of dropping, downloading and installing stages, with deployment of a Trojan-backdoor at the final stage." Much of the sequence is hidden from detection in a sophisticated manner, including hiding data steganographically in a PNG image. In their announcement report, Kaspersky Lab concluded: "The Titanium APT has a very complicated infiltration scheme. It involves numerous steps and requires good coordination between all of them. In addition, none of the files in the file system can be detected as malicious due to the use of encryption and fileless technologies. One other feature that makes detection harder is the mimicking of well-known software. Regarding campaign activity, we have not detected any current activity [as of 8 November 2019] related to the Titanium APT."

== See also ==
- Serial over LAN
- Timeline of notable computer viruses and worms
