= Streamcore =

French company

- Company type: S.A. (corporation)
- Industry: Technology
- Founded: 2004; 22 years ago
- Headquarters: Puteaux, France
- Key people: Diaa Elyaacoubi
- Products: StreamGroomers (SG); StreamGroomer Managers (SGM)
- Parent: ORSYP (acquired by Automic Software then CA Technologies )
- Website: streamcore.com

Streamcore is a French information technology company specializing in quality of service (QoS), controlling/monitoring Unified Communications (VoIP, video), and application delivery management over the Wide area network (WAN). Their products enable "WAN 2.0 Assurance" and cloud applications.

Streamcore's main client base consists of large enterprises, operators, and governmental agencies who seek to ensure the quality of strategic applications.

== History ==
The company was originally founded in 1996 by Rémi Després with his colleagues André Krempf, Remi Lucet and René Le Goff. The company was taken over in 2004 by Diaa Elyaacoubi who re-established the company under the name Streamcore System.

In November 2012, Streamcore was acquired by American IT Operations Management company, ORSYP. This acquisition enables ORSYP to address their customers critical challenges of optimizing delivery of IT services to end-user throughout the enterprise network in real-time as well as anticipating future demands. Headquartered in Boston, Hong Kong, and Paris, ORSYP had regional offices in Germany, Italy, Singapore, United Arab Emirates, and the United Kingdom.

== Products ==
- StreamGroomers: regulate the traffic exchanged between LAN and WAN networks. Traffic is monitored and controlled according to network, application, VoIP and video rules.
- StreamGroomer Managers: centralized management system, provides real time monitoring as well as a view of the WAN infrastructure and application performance.
