= ZTP =

ZTP may refer to:

== Science and technology ==
- ZTP, a ribonucleotide derivative sensed by the Pfl RNA motif
- Zero-touch provisioning, remotely provisioning network devices
- Zero-truncated Poisson distribution, in probability theory

== Other uses ==
- ŽTP, Yugoslav Railways' Belgrade, Novi Sad, Skoplje and Titograd sections, serviced by ŽS series 412 trains
- Zeebrugge Hub (Zeebrugge Trading Point), a gas hub in Zeebrugge
