= TM2 =

TM2 or Tm2 may refer to:

- Soyuz TM-2, the spacecraft used to launch a long duration crew to the Soviet space station Mir
- Thermal Monitor 2, a computer central processing unit thermal control
- TM2, a Rolls-Royce Marine Olympus gas turbine
- Square terametre (Tm^{2}), a multiple of the SI unit of surface area, the square metre
- Tm^2, a metric unit equal to a weber
- Twisted Metal 2, a 1996 video game
- TM2 (software), a technical SEO checker developed by TrafficMatrix and available as a web-based tool and Chrome extension.

== See also ==
- 5857 Neglinka (1975 TM2), a main-belt asteroid
