= Platform Environment Control Interface =

Platform Environment Control Interface (PECI) is an Intel proprietary single wire serial interface that provides a communication channel between Intel processors and chipset components to external system management logic and thermal monitoring devices. Also, PECI provides an interface for external devices to read processor temperature, perform processor manageability functions, and manage processor interface tuning and diagnostics. Typically in server platforms, CPUs are the PECI slaves and Platform Controller Hub (PCH) is the PECI master, meanwhile in client segment, CPU is usually the PECI slave and EC/BMC is the PECI master. PECI was introduced in 2006 with the Intel Core 2 Duo microprocessors.

Support for PECI was added to the Linux kernel version 5.18 in 2022.

== Thermal monitoring details ==
While previous thermal management technologies have made use of thermal diodes, PECI instead uses on-die digital thermal sensors (DTS). These sensors, after being calibrated at the factory, are able to provide digital data concerning processor temperature information. The PECI bus, allowing access to this data from chipset components, is a proprietary single-wire interface with a variable data transfer speed (from 2 kbit/s to 2 Mbit/s).

From a control standpoint, the main difference between PECI and the previously used thermal monitoring methods is that PECI reports a negative value expressing the difference between the current temperature and the thermal throttle point (at which the CPU reduces speed or shuts down to prevent damage due to overheating) instead of the absolute temperature. For example, for a CPU with maximal temperature of 85 °C and a current temperature reading of 35 °C, the value reported by PECI would be −50 °C.

== Advantages ==
Since the value reported by PECI takes into account internal processor information about safe operating temperatures, it alleviates the need for the BIOS or operating system to make potentially incorrect assumptions about this limit. Furthermore, it supports dynamic fan control with a high degree of accuracy, where fan speed can be progressively increased as the value approaches zero.

== See also ==
- Host Embedded Controller Interface (HECI)
- Thermal Monitoring 2

== Sources ==
- Dual-Core Intel Xeon Processor 3000 Series Datasheet
- Dual-Core Intel Xeon Processor 5100 Series Datasheet
- Intel Core 2 Extreme X6800 and Core 2 Duo E6000 and E4000 Sequence Features
