= AMD Platform Security Processor =

Trusted execution environment subsystem that runs on AMD microprocessors

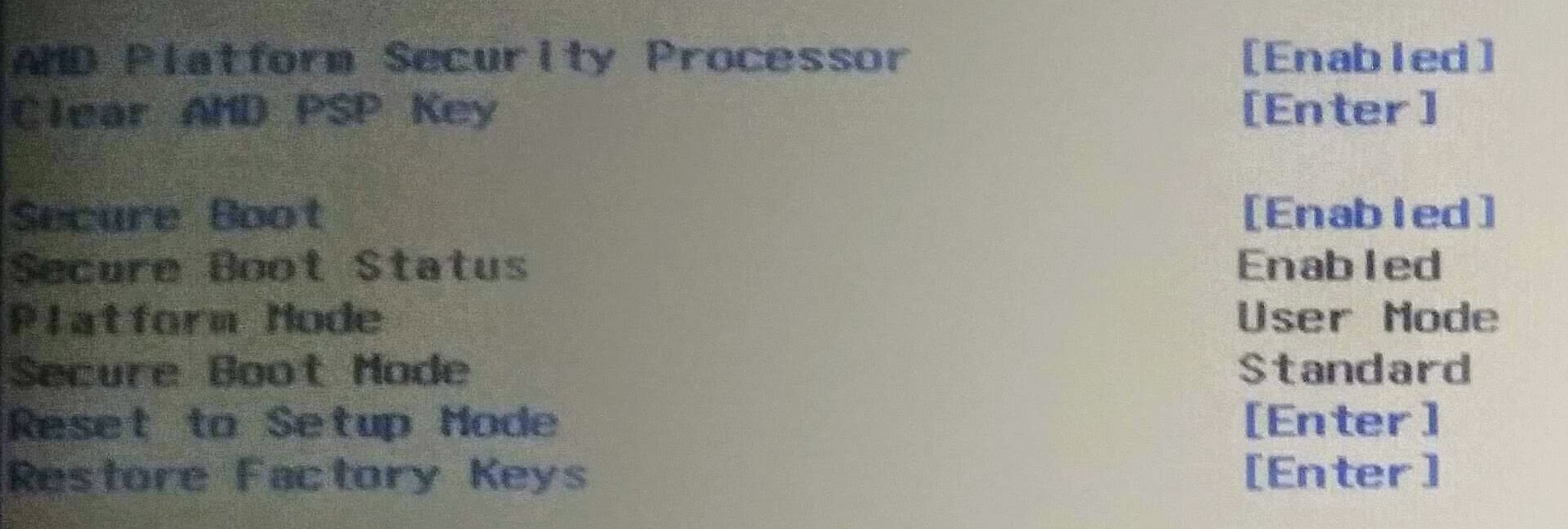
AMD Platform Security Processor settings in an UEFI configuration screen

The AMD Platform Security Processor (PSP), officially known as AMD Secure Technology, is a trusted execution environment subsystem incorporated since about 2013 into AMD microprocessors. According to an AMD developer's guide, the subsystem is "responsible for creating, monitoring and maintaining the security environment" and "its functions include managing the boot process, initializing various security related mechanisms, and monitoring the system for any type of activity or events and implementing an appropriate response". Critics worry it can be used as a backdoor and is a security concern. AMD has denied requests to open source the code that runs on the PSP.

The equivalent part of PSP on Intel processors is the Intel Management Engine (IME).

== Details ==
The PSP itself represents an ARM core (ARM Cortex-A5) with the TrustZone extension which is inserted into the main CPU die as a coprocessor. The PSP contains on-chip firmware which is responsible for verifying the SPI ROM and loading off-chip firmware from it. The PSP also includes a boot processor, which is responsible for some hardware initialization tasks (such as DRAM initialization) in the boot process. In 2019, a Berlin-based security group discovered the off-chip firmware in ordinary UEFI image files (the code that boots up the operating system), which meant that it could be easily analyzed. By using a few hand-written Python-based tools, they found that the off-chip firmware from the SPI ROM contained an application resembling an entire micro operating system. Investigation of a Lenovo ThinkPad A285 notebook's motherboard flash chip (stores UEFI firmware) revealed that the PSP core itself (as a device) is run before the main CPU and that its firmware bootstrapping process starts just before basic UEFI gets loaded. They discovered that the firmware is run inside in the same system's memory space that user's applications do with unrestricted access to it (including MMIO) raising concerns over data safety. Because PSP is the chip that decides whenever the x86 cores will run or not, it is used to implement hardware downcoring, specific cores on the system can be made permanently inaccessible during manufacturing. The PSP also provides a random number generator for the RDRAND instruction and provides TPM services.

The OEM/ODM can OTP fuse its PSB public key into the AMD CPU, make digital signing of the UEFI firmware obligatory, and make tampering with the UEFI firmware impossible.

== Boot process ==
The PSP is an integral part of the boot process, without which the x86 cores would never be activated.

On-chip phase
Firmware ROM integrated directly on the PSP chip sets up the PSP, do early hardware initialization tasks such as system memory (DRAM) initialization, and verifies the integrity of the SPI ROM, using various data structures locates the off-chip firmware (AGESA) from the SPI ROM, and loads it into PSP memory.
Off-chip phase
The PSP will do further hardware initialization tasks such as reinitialize DRAM. The PSP may perform additional verification steps and if the system is deemed secure, the PSP will find and load UEFI firmware within the SPI ROM, thus starting x86 cores. While UEFI firmware and x86 cores is started, the PSP still do some hardware initialization tasks (such as I/O subsystem initialization) and collaborate with UEFI firmware in the boot process.

== Reported vulnerabilities ==
In September 2017, Google security researcher Cfir Cohen reported a vulnerability to AMD of a PSP subsystem that could allow an attacker access to passwords, certificates, and other sensitive information; a patch was rumored to become available to vendors in December 2017.

In March 2018, Israeli computer security firm CTS Labs claimed to have discovered major vulnerabilities in Zen chipset PSPs, affecting Epyc, Ryzen, Ryzen Pro, and Ryzen Mobile. Independent security experts agreed that the flaws were genuine, but that they were not as severe as claimed, requiring local administrator access to exploit. AMD announced firmware updates to handle these flaws. CTS Labs publicized the findings after giving AMD only 24 hours to respond, leading to claims that the flaws were published for the purpose of stock manipulation.

== See also ==
- Intel Management Engine
