= Phosh =

Graphical interface for mobile devices

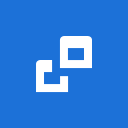

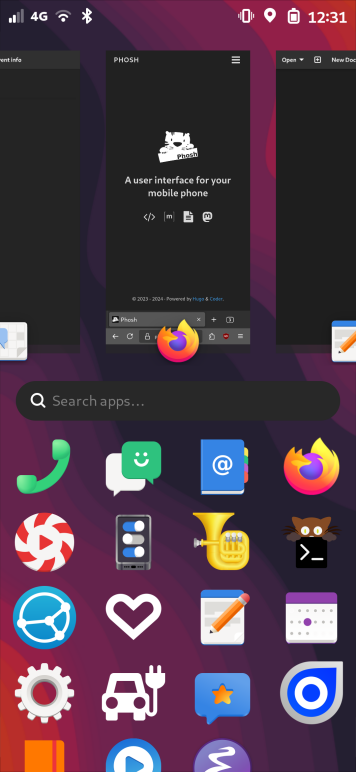
- Phosh 0.44 Overview screen
- Developers: Free software community, formerly Purism, SPC
- Release: September 20, 2018; 8 years ago
- Stable release: 0.58.0 / October 4, 2026; 35 days ago
- Written in: C
- Operating system: Linux, BSD, other Unix-like
- Type: Graphical shell
- License: GNU GPLv3
- Website: phosh.mobi
- Repository: gitlab.gnome.org/World/Phosh/phosh

Phosh (portmanteau of phone and shell) is a graphical user interface designed for mobile and touch-based devices initially developed by Purism. The project is maintained and developed by a diverse community, and is the default shell used on several mobile Linux operating systems including PureOS, Mobian and Fedora Phosh. It is also an option on Nura, Manjaro, and openSUSE. The Phosh project maintains immutable OS images for their nightly builds called BengalOS. Phosh's components follow a six-week release cycle.

Phosh is used by several vendors as their default user interface, examples are Purism's Librem 5 and Librem 11 and Furilabs' FLX1 and FLX1s.

== Development ==
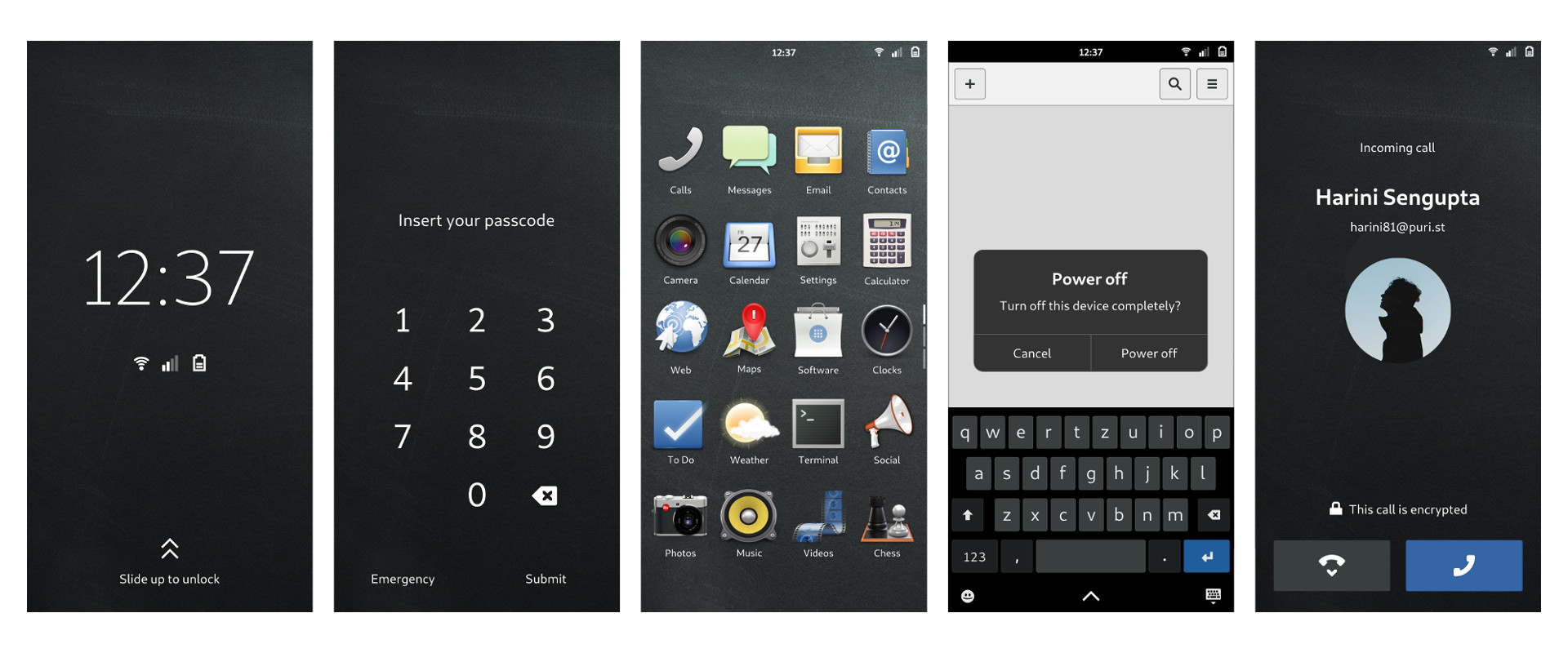
2018 mockups of Phosh

In August 2017, Purism, personal computing hardware vendors and developers of PureOS announced their intention to release a privacy-centric smartphone that ran a mobile-optimized version of their Linux-based operating system. With this announcement, Purism released mockups of Phosh that resembled a modified GNOME Shell. This eventually became known as the Librem 5.

In April 2018, Purism started to publicly release documentation that referenced Phosh with updated mockups, and hired GNOME UI/UX developer Tobias Bernard to directly contribute to the shell.

Despite the Librem 5 phone being delayed, Phosh received its first official release in September 2018, which was primarily focused on developer usage. The first official hardware for direct use with Phosh was shipped several months later in December when Purism shipped hardware devkits. In July 2020, the PinePhone was released with a version of postmarketOS that featured the Phosh interface.

Since August 2021, Phosh's source code repository (including issue tracking and merge request handling) has been hosted by the GNOME Foundation. To ease testing of current development versions the project maintains nightly package builds for Debian based distributions.

In February 2025, the Phosh.mobi e.V. was founded, supporting the Phosh project in financial and legal matters.

== Features ==
=== Overview ===
The Phosh Overview screen is the primary method to interact with the shell. It contains the App Grid, which displays user applications that can be launched from icons. The App Grid is split into two sections. The top section is reserved for frequently-used applications, and is known as "Favorites". The bottom section is reserved for all other installed applications.

In addition, a functionality is included that allows users to type search terms to find specific applications. The Overview screen also contains the Activities view, which visualizes the currently-opened applications, and gives a method to dismiss them as well.

=== Lock Screen ===
When the device's display is toggled from off to on, Phosh displays a Lock Screen with the time and date along with several indicator icons that illustrate the device's status of cellular network service, Wi-Fi, Bluetooth, and battery percentage. The Lock screen can display the status of ongoing phone calls (including emergency calls) and is extendable via plugins. Upon sliding up from the bottom of the screen, the Lock Screen requests a predefined passcode to unlock and continue to the Overview screen.

== Related technologies ==
Phosh is based-on the GTK widget toolkit, and uses a custom compositor based on wlroots. Like GNOME Shell, Phosh relies upon certain GNOME components to provide a fully-featured mobile interface. Primary examples of this are its use of the GNOME Session Manager for session management and the GNOME Settings Daemon for storing application and shell settings. Phosh also makes use of some freedesktop.org system components such as Polkit, UPower, iio-sensor-proxy, NetworkManager and ModemManager.

It is both open source and libre software. Apart from the phone shell the project develops and maintains related technologies and components used in conjunction with Phosh, some of these also initiated by developers at Purism, like Phoc (a Wayland compositor using the wlroots library), Stevia (an on-screen virtual keyboard), feedbackd (a haptic feedback daemon), cellbroadcastd (a daemon for receiving and storing Cell Broadcast messages), a settings application, mobile friendly xdg-desktop-portal backends and parts of libadwaita regarding adaptive windowing to allow for otherwise desktop-centric apps to act and feel as true mobile apps.

Phrog uses Phosh to conduct a greetd conversation, which is used on mobile Linux distributions like Mobian. It replaces the previous greeter Phog, this time using unmodified Phosh code.

== See also ==
- Plasma Mobile
- PureOS
- Librem 5
- Libhandy
