= Thermal Monitor 2 =

Thermal Monitor 2 (TM2) is a throttling control method used on LGA 775 versions of the Core 2, Pentium Dual-Core, Pentium D, Pentium 4 and Celeron processors and also on the Pentium M series of processors. TM2 reduces processor temperature by lowering the CPU clock multiplier, and thereby the processor core speed.

In contrast, Thermal Monitor 1 inserts an idle cycle into the CPU for thermal control without decreasing multipliers.

TM1 and TM2 are associated with DTS/PECI — Digital Temperature Sensor/Platform Environment Control Interface.
