= Stable Image Platform Program =

Stable Image Platform Program or Stable IT Platform Program is the name of an initiative introduced by Intel. The idea is that a pre-configured disk image will work on any of the certified hardware combinations. Intel states the program guarantees "At least 12 months of Deployment for Image Compatible Platforms."

Intel's main competitor, AMD, later introduced a similar program.
