= PureOS =

Linux distribution

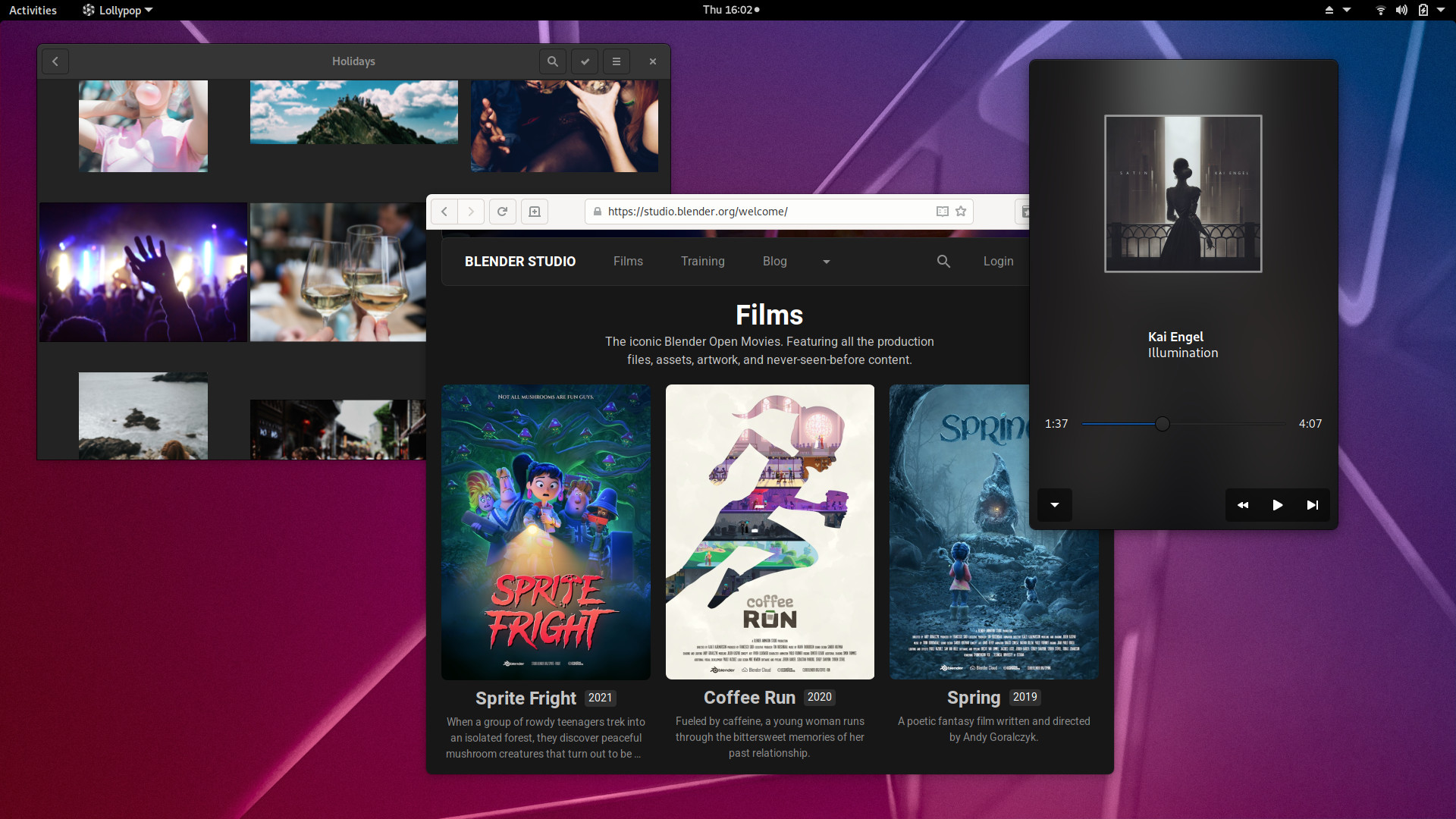
- PureOS 10.0 with GNOME
- Developer: Purism and community contributors
- OS family: Unix-like (Linux kernel)
- Working state: Current
- Source model: Open source
- Latest release: 11 / 20 May 2026; 2 months ago
- Repository: repo.pureos.net/pureos/pool/main/
- Kernel type: Linux kernel
- Default user interface: GNOME, KDE
- License: Free software licenses (mainly GPL)
- Official website: pureos.net

PureOS is a Linux distribution focusing on privacy and security, using the GNOME or KDE Plasma desktop environment. It is maintained by Purism for use in the company's Librem laptop computers as well as the Librem 5 and Liberty Phone smartphones.

PureOS is designed to include only free software, and is included in the list of free Linux distributions published by the Free Software Foundation.

PureOS is a Debian-based Linux distribution, merging open-source software packages from the Debian “testing” main archive using a hybrid point release and rolling release model. The default web browser in PureOS is GNOME Web. The default search engine is DuckDuckGo.

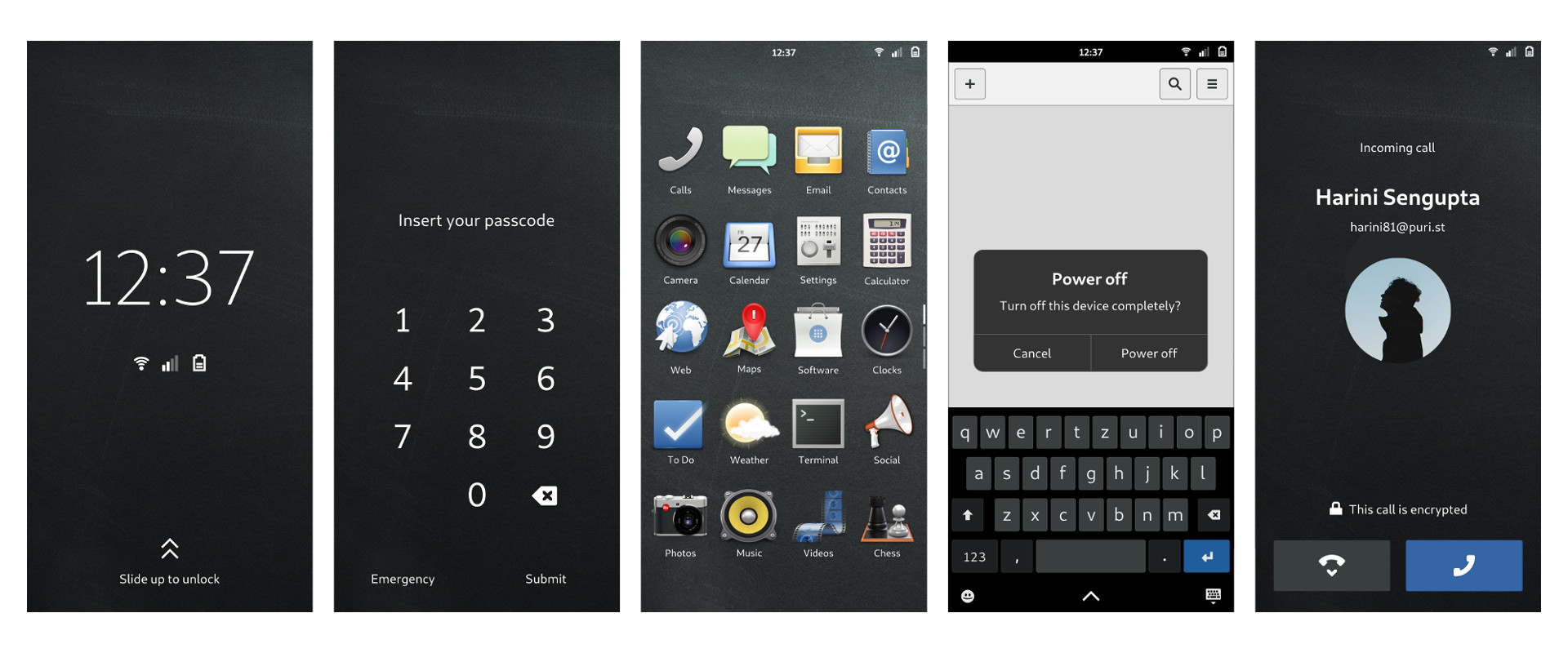
The mobile interface of PureOS, Phosh, the GNOME mobile shell, developed by Purism and GNOME (2018-05)

== Also see ==
- GNU Free System Distribution Guidelines
- List of Linux distributions based on Debian testing branch
