= Client Initiated Remote Access =

Intel CIRA enables out-of-band management systems, such as Intel AMT. It is intended to enable centralized corporate management and administration of laptops that are not attached to the corporate LAN, but rather are located off-site (homes, hotels, etc.). Because off-site systems will typically be behind a firewall, there is no way for the corporate administrator to directly find the machine. Thus, instead, the system (the 'client') will initiate a connection to the corporate administration server; the server can then use this connection to admin the machine.

The system is implemented in firmware, and is meant to enable administration resources such as Intel AMT and Intel vPro.

== See also ==
- Intel vPro
