= Purism (company) =

Computer manufacturer focusing on software freedom

Purism, SPC
- Type: Social purpose corporation
- Industry: Computer hardware; Electronics
- Founded: November 19, 2014; 11 years ago
- Founder: Todd Weaver
- Headquarters: San Francisco, California, U.S.
- Area served: Worldwide
- Key people: Todd Weaver (CEO)
- Products: Laptops, smartphones, tablet computers, handhelds
- Revenue: US$1 million (2015)
- Number of employees: 32 (April 2022)
- Website: puri.sm

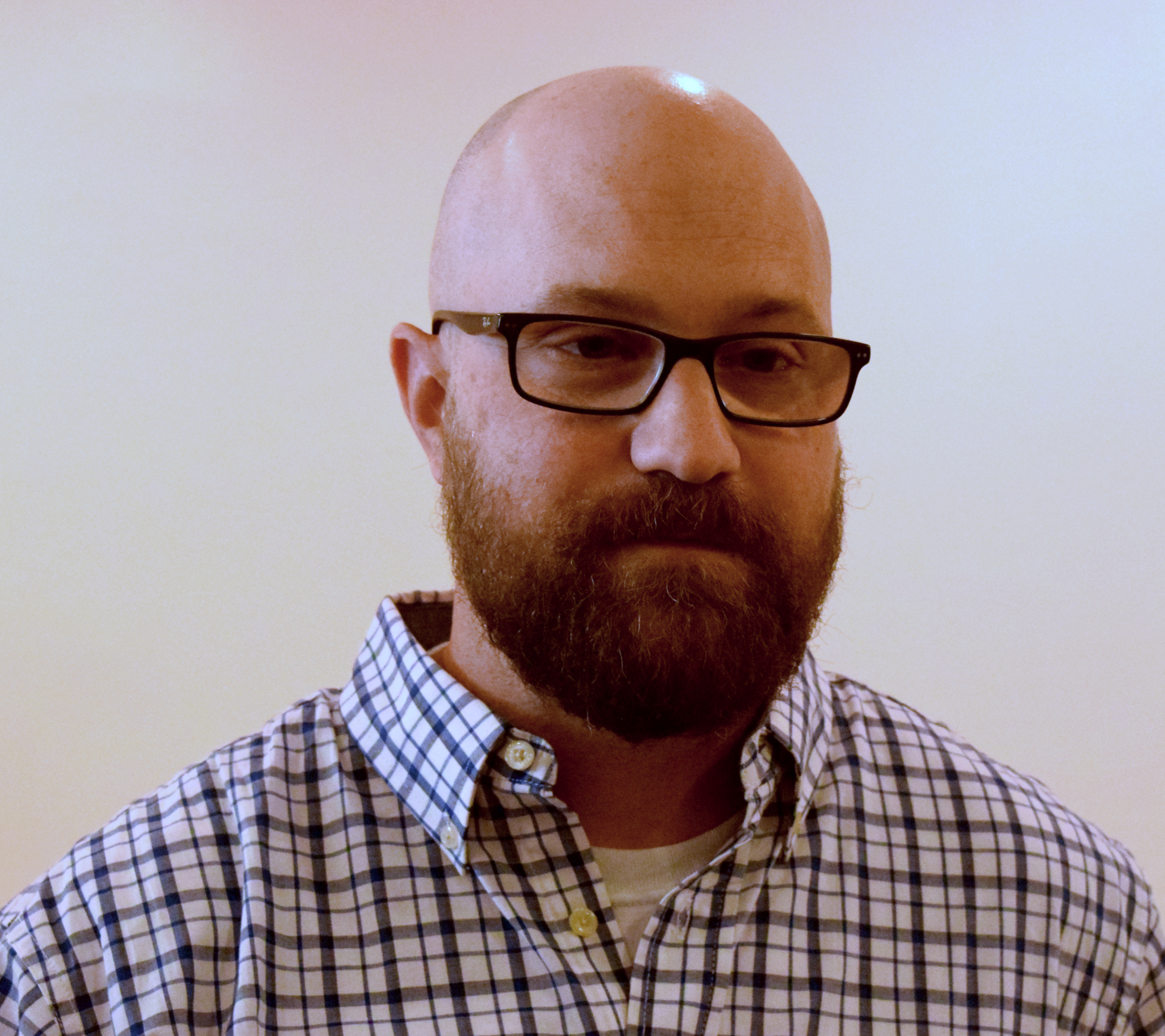
Todd Weaver in Swathanthra 2017 at Thiruvananthapuram, Kerala, India

Purism, SPC is an American computer technology corporation based in San Francisco, California and registered in the state of Washington.

Purism manufactures the Librem personal computing devices with a focus on software freedom, computer security, and internet privacy. In addition to hardware, Purism also maintains PureOS, an operating system along with Librem One, a suite of software as a service based on open standards.

== History ==
Purism was founded in 2014 with a crowdfunding campaign for the Librem 15, An attempt to manufacture an Intel-based high-end laptop for Linux with "almost no proprietary software". A second campaign funded development of a 13-inch model with hardware switches to disable the microphone and camera as a privacy feature. These hardware switches were also added to the 15-inch model.

The two campaigns raised US$1,052,174 from 1,042 initial backers, and production began at the end of 2015. In 2017 Purism announced its transition from a build to order to a build to stock order fulfillment model.

Purism reincorporated as a social purpose corporation in February 2017 and announced the change in May.

In 2023, the company was criticized for inconsistent messaging and enforcement of their refund policy, rejecting refunds for multiple customers having valid refund requests. Louis Rossmann covered Purism in two videos: the first described one customer's refund request experience and Rossmann's disdain for Purism's behavior; the second described an impassioned email addressed to Rossmann from a Purism volunteer, describing the situation from their perspective with the goal of removing the critical video. Rossmann did not remove the video and the volunteer was dismissed from the organization shortly after the video was published.

== Products ==
=== PureOS ===
Purism manages development of PureOS, a free Linux distro based on Debian. PureOS mostly ships with software from the Debian software repository but has all software removed that violates Purism's guidelines and the GNU Free System Distribution Guidelines. PureOS was endorsed by the Free Software Foundation in December 2017. Librem laptops ship with PureOS by default and an optional Qubes OS Universal Serial Bus (USB) drive. Purism says that it is easy for Librem device owners to install alternative Linux distributions and that owners have the freedom to install any operating system that they desire.

=== Librem hardware ===
Librem has been the brand name used by Purism for all of their computer hardware products since the firm's first website in late 2014. The name is based on the French word libre for the English word free as used in the term logiciel libre for free software.

Purism devices feature hardware kill switches to allow users to shut off the camera, Wi-Fi, Bluetooth, and cellular or mobile broadband modem on devices that have one (or can be purchased air gapped).

==== Laptops ====
Purism's first products were two laptop computers. Since late 2015, they have made laptops of two sizes: Librem 13 and 15, featuring a 13 and a 15-inch screen, respectively. These products ship with Purism's own operating system, PureOS, a derivative of Debian, and an optional Qubes OS USB drive.

Purism does its best to remove Intel's Management Engine from its Librem laptops, considering it a security problem. Still, it was unable to completely avoid using proprietary BIOS firmware, earning criticism from the Coreboot and Libreboot projects (which are working on free firmware, but as of 2015 had not yet achieved support of the contemporary hardware that Librem uses). Since summer 2017, new Librem laptops are shipped with coreboot as their standard BIOS, and updates are available for all older models.

In July 2020, Purism announced the Librem 14, the successor of the Librem 13. The Librem 14 features a 10th generation Intel processor, and was scheduled to begin shipping in February 2021.

===== Comparison of laptops =====
Librem model	Coreboot version	CPU	Intel ME	Release	Max RAM (GB)
16 v1	26.03 (2026)	Intel Core i7-13620H	Disabled	June 2026	64
15 v1	4.21 (2023)	Intel Core i7 5557U	Disabled	July 2015	32
13 v1	4.21 (2023)	Intel Core i5 5200U	Disabled	September 2015	16
15 v2	4.21 (2023)	Intel Core i7-5557U	Disabled	September 2015	32
13 v2	4.21 (2023)	Intel Core i5 6200U	Disabled	June 14, 2017	16
15 v3	4.21 (2023)	Intel Core i7 6500U	Disabled	June 28, 2017	32
13 v3	4.21 (2023)	Intel Core i7 6500U	Disabled	October 2017	16
15 v4	4.21 (2023)	Intel Core i7 7500U	Disabled	January 2019	32
13 v4	4.21 (2023)	Intel Core i7 7500U	Disabled	January 2019	16
14 v1	4.21 (2023)	Intel Core i7 10710U	Disabled	early Q4 2020	64

==== Tablet: Librem 11 ====
Purism has proposed a 2-in-1 PC, a convertible, hybrid, tablet-to-laptop computer: the Librem 11, sometimes termed Librem 10 or 12. It would have an 11-inch touchscreen in an 11.6-inch body with a detachable keyboard, and an optional docking station. Development on the device began in April 2016 and was suspended in October 2018 to focus on the Librem 5 smartphone.

==== Smartphones ====
===== Liberty Phone =====
The Liberty Phone (previously marketed as Librem 5 USA) is a variant of the Librem 5 that also runs PureOS on a quad-core 64-bit SoC, but with increased specifications (4 GB RAM and 128 GB internal storage). Unlike the Librem 5, the internal electronics are claimed as being assembled within the United States and is marketed as having "Made in USA Electronics"

===== Librem 5 =====
The Librem 5 is Purism's first smartphone. A funding campaign for Librem 5 started on 24 August 2017, for a $599 "security and privacy focused phone". The 60-day funding campaign aimed to collect US$1.5 million, but the goal was surpassed two weeks early and concluded with US$2,677,609.10 raised, 78% over the goal.

The phone's operating system is entirely free software: it comes with PureOS pre-installed but also supports Ubuntu Touch. On the hardware level, the baseband processor is separated and isolated from the CPU main bus, and connected via a fast USB interface instead. The phone also implements hardware kill switches for the isolated baseband processor, Wi-Fi, Bluetooth, camera, and microphone. The firmware for the cellular modem on the phone is proprietary. Purism shipped the first Librem 5 phones in September 2019.

Release of the Librem 5 took much longer than anticipated; Purism cited product development and supply chain challenges for the multi-year product fulfillment delays.

==== Librem Key ====
The Librem Key is a hardware USB security token with many features, including integration with tamper-evident Heads Firmware. Heads help to ensure that the Librem laptop's BIOS was not altered since the last laptop boot. The Librem Key also holds a one-time password storage (3x HOTP (RFC 4226), 15 x TOTP (RFC 6238)), integrated password manager (16 entries), 40 kbit/s true random number generator, and tamper-resistant smart card. The key supports type A USB 2.0, has dimensions of 48 mm × 19 mm × 7 mm (1.89 in × 0.75 in × 0.28 in), and weighs 6 grams (0.21 oz).

=== Librem One ===
Librem One is a paid subscription free-software social-networking suite launched April 30, 2019 claiming to prioritize decentralization and privacy, using repackaged open source applications. At present, services provided are: Librem Mail supporting OpenPGP standards using a K-9-based client; Librem Tunnel based on OpenVPN; Librem Social microblogging using Mastodon server and Tusky-based client software federated via the ActivityPub protocol, and Librem Chat using Element software federated via Matrix and XMPP.

== See also ==
- Linux adoption
- System76
- Framework Computer
- Pine64
