= Shell shoveling =

Computer network security concept

Shell shoveling, in network security, is the act of redirecting the input and output of a shell to a service so that it can be remotely accessed, a remote shell.

In computing, the most basic method of interfacing with the operating system is the shell. On Microsoft Windows based systems, this is a program called cmd.exe or COMMAND.COM. On Unix or Unix-like systems, it may be any of a variety of programs such as bash, ksh, etc. This program accepts commands typed from a prompt and executes them, usually in real time, displaying the results to what is referred to as standard output, usually a monitor or screen.

In the shell shoveling process, one of these programs is set to run (perhaps silently or without notifying someone observing the computer) accepting input from a remote system and redirecting output to the same remote system; therefore the operator of the shoveled shell is able to operate the computer as if they were present at the console.

== See also ==
- Console redirection
- CTTY (DOS command)
- Serial over LAN redirection (SOL)
- Remote Shell
