= Network traffic control =

Managing communications bottlenecks and efficiency

In computer networking, network traffic control is the process of managing, controlling or reducing the network traffic, particularly Internet bandwidth, e.g. by the network scheduler. It is used by network administrators, to reduce congestion, latency and packet loss. This is part of bandwidth management. In order to use these tools effectively, it is necessary to measure the network traffic to determine the causes of network congestion and attack those problems specifically.

Network traffic control is an important subject in datacenters as it is necessary for efficient use of datacenter network bandwidth and for maintaining service level agreements.

== Traffic shaping ==
Traffic shaping is the retiming (delaying) of packets (or frames) until they meet specified bandwidth and or burstiness limits. Since such delays involve queues that are nearly always finite and, once full, excess traffic is nearly always dropped (discarded), traffic shaping nearly always implies traffic policing as well.

== Traffic policing ==
Traffic policing is the dropping (discarding) or reduction in priority (demoting) of packets (or frames) that exceed some specified bandwidth and or burstiness limit.
