= Serial over LAN =

Mechanism that allows the serial port of a managed system to be redirected over IP

Serial over LAN (SOL) is a mechanism that enables the input and output of the serial port of a managed system to be redirected over IP on a local area network (LAN).

== Details ==
On some managed systems, notably blade server systems, the serial ports on the managed computers are not normally connected to a traditional serial port socket. To allow users to access applications on these computers via the serial port, the input/output of the serial port is redirected to the network. For example, a user wishing to access a blade server via the serial port can telnet to a network address and log in. On the blade server the login will be seen as coming through the serial port.

SOL is implemented as a payload type under the RMCP+ protocol in IPMI.

== See also ==
- Console redirection
- Emergency Management Services
- Intelligent Platform Management Interface
- Shell shoveling
- Virtual COM port
