= Bochs =

Portable emulator and PC debugger

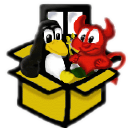

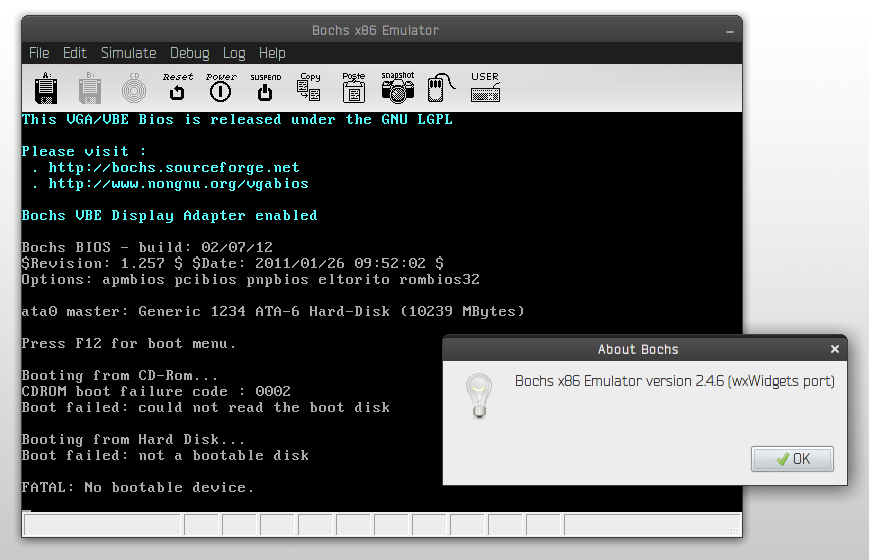
- Bochs 2.4.6 with its "wx" graphical interface (wx display library) on Debian 7 Linux
- Original author: Kevin Lawton
- Developers: Community based; owned by Mandriva
- Release: 1994; 32 years ago
- Stable release: 3.1 / 23 August 2026; 50 days ago
- Written in: C++
- Operating system: Linux, BSD (FreeBSD, NetBSD, OpenBSD, Darwin OS, macOS), Windows, Windows CE along with its derivatives, OS/2, BeOS, MorphOS, AmigaOS, Android OS, PlayStation 2
- Platform: IA-32, x64
- Available in: English
- Type: Emulator
- License: GNU Lesser General Public License
- Website: bochs.sourceforge.io
- Repository: github.com/bochs-emu/Bochs

Bochs (pronounced "box") is a portable IA-32 and x86-64 IBM PC compatible emulator and debugger mostly written in C++ and distributed as free software under the GNU Lesser General Public License. It supports emulation of the processor(s) (including protected mode), memory, disks, display, Ethernet, BIOS and common hardware peripherals of PCs.

Many guest operating systems can be run using the emulator including DOS, several versions of Linux, Xenix, Microsoft Windows, BSDs and Rhapsody OS (precursor of Mac OS X Public Beta). Bochs runs on many host operating systems, including Android OS, Linux, macOS, PlayStation 2, Windows, and Windows CE along with its derivatives.

Bochs is mostly used for operating system development (when an emulated operating system crashes, it does not crash the host operating system, so the emulated OS can be debugged) and to run other guest operating systems inside already running host operating systems. It can also be used to run older software — such as PC games — which will not run on non-compatible, or too fast computers.

== History ==
Bochs started as a program with a commercial license, at the price of US$25, for use as-is. If a user needed to link it to other software, that user would have to negotiate a special license. That changed on 22 March 2000, when Mandrakesoft (later Mandriva) bought Bochs from lead developer Kevin Lawton and released it for Linux under the GNU Lesser General Public License. Support for hosting on Windows XP ended with version 2.6.10.

== Use ==
Bochs emulates the hardware needed by PC operating systems, including hard drives, CD drives, and floppy drives. It doesn't utilize any host CPU virtualization features, therefore is slower than most virtualization (as opposed to emulation) software. It provides additional security by completely isolating the guest OS from the hardware. Bochs also has extensive debugging features. It is widely used for OS development, as it removes the need for constant system restarts (to test code).

BFE, described as a "Graphical Debugger Interface for the Bochs PC Emulator", is a graphical interface for the debugger within the Bochs PC emulator that makes it possible to debug software step-by-step at the instruction and register level, much like Borland's Turbo Debugger.

== Emulated hardware ==
Class	Device
Video card	Cirrus Logic CL-GD5430 ISA
Video card	Cirrus Logic CL-GD5446 PCI
Video card	3dfx Interactive Voodoo Banshee / Voodoo3
Video card	Nvidia Geforce 2 Pro
Video card	Nvidia Geforce 3 Ti 500
Video card	Nvidia Geforce FX 5900
Video card	Nvidia Geforce 6 6800GT
Sound card	Sound Blaster 16 (ISA, no Plug & Play), ES1370 (PCI), Basic Sound Device
Ethernet network card	NE2000 (ISA/PCI) Ethernet or Intel(R) 82540EM Gigabit Ethernet adapter (PCI)
Chipset	Intel 430FX PCI, Intel 440FX PCI and Intel 440BX AGP northbridge. PIIX3 and PIIX4 southbridge. For PCI cards there are 5 PCI slots.
USB	Root hub and the devices mouse (optional), tablet, keypad (default), disk.
SMP	Can simulate up to 8 CPUs.
Enhanced BIOS or SeaBIOS	ElTorito, EDD, APM, PCIBIOS, PCI interrupt routing table, PnP, ACPI, SMM, MPS and VBE.
