= Open-source firmware =

Open-source firmware is firmware that is published under an open-source license. It can be contrasted with proprietary firmware, which is published under a proprietary license or EULA.

== Examples ==
- OpenWrt
- DD-WRT
- coreboot
- SeaBIOS
- LinuxBoot
- Libreboot
- Marlin (firmware), Arduino-based firmware for 3D printers
- PinePhone LTE modem
- Rockbox, a replacement firmware for various digital audio players
- QMK
- U-Boot

== See also ==
- Open-source software
