= AR7 =

AR7, AR 7, or AR-7 may refer to:

- ArmaLite AR-7, a .22 caliber semi-automatic survival rifle
- Arkansas Highway 7 (AR 7) is a north–south state highway that runs across the state.
- Arkansas's 7th congressional district, an obsolete district
- Texas Instruments AR7 is a fully integrated single-chip ADSL CPE access router solution.
- Thyroid hormone receptor alpha (AR7), a nuclear receptor protein
- USS Hector (AR-7), a repair ship of the US Navy
- AR-7 Radio Receiver, an Australian Second World War-era communications receiver similar to the National HRO, developed by the Kingsley radio company. Also known as the Kingsley K/CR/11.
