= Rapid Boot =

Rapid Boot is an EFI BIOS alternative using a Linux kernel (in the BIOS flash part) developed by Intel Corporation, primarily intended for computer clusters. It significantly reduces the system boot time by removing features which do not add value in the HPC environment.

The features the BIOS supports include:

- CPU
  - Multiple Processor Initialization
  - Intel dual-core and quad-core support
  - Microcode support
- Memory Initialization
- POST Codes
- PCI
- USB
- ATA
- ACPI support
- Rolling BIOS support

== See also ==
- Coreboot
- Das U-Boot
