= Intel 430HX =

Chipset designed by Intel

- Codename: Triton II
- CPU supported: Pentium; Pentium MMX; Cyrix 6x86 AMD K5; AMD K6
- Socket supported: Socket 7
- Southbridge: Intel PIIX3

Miscellaneous
- Release date: February 1996
- Predecessor: Intel 430FX
- Successor: Intel 430VX; Intel 430TX

The Intel 430HX (codenamed Triton II) is a chipset from Intel, supporting Socket 7 processors, including the Pentium and Pentium MMX. It is also known as i430HX and it was released in February 1996. The official part number is 82430HX.

== Features ==
The 430HX chipset had all the features of the 430FX (Triton I) plus support for ECC, parity RAM, two-way SMP, USB, and then current PCI to improve speed.

It consists of one 82439HX TXC, the northbridge and one PIIX3, the southbridge. The 430HX chipset supported up to 512MB of RAM (64MB or 512MB cacheable depending on tag RAM size).

=== Gallery ===
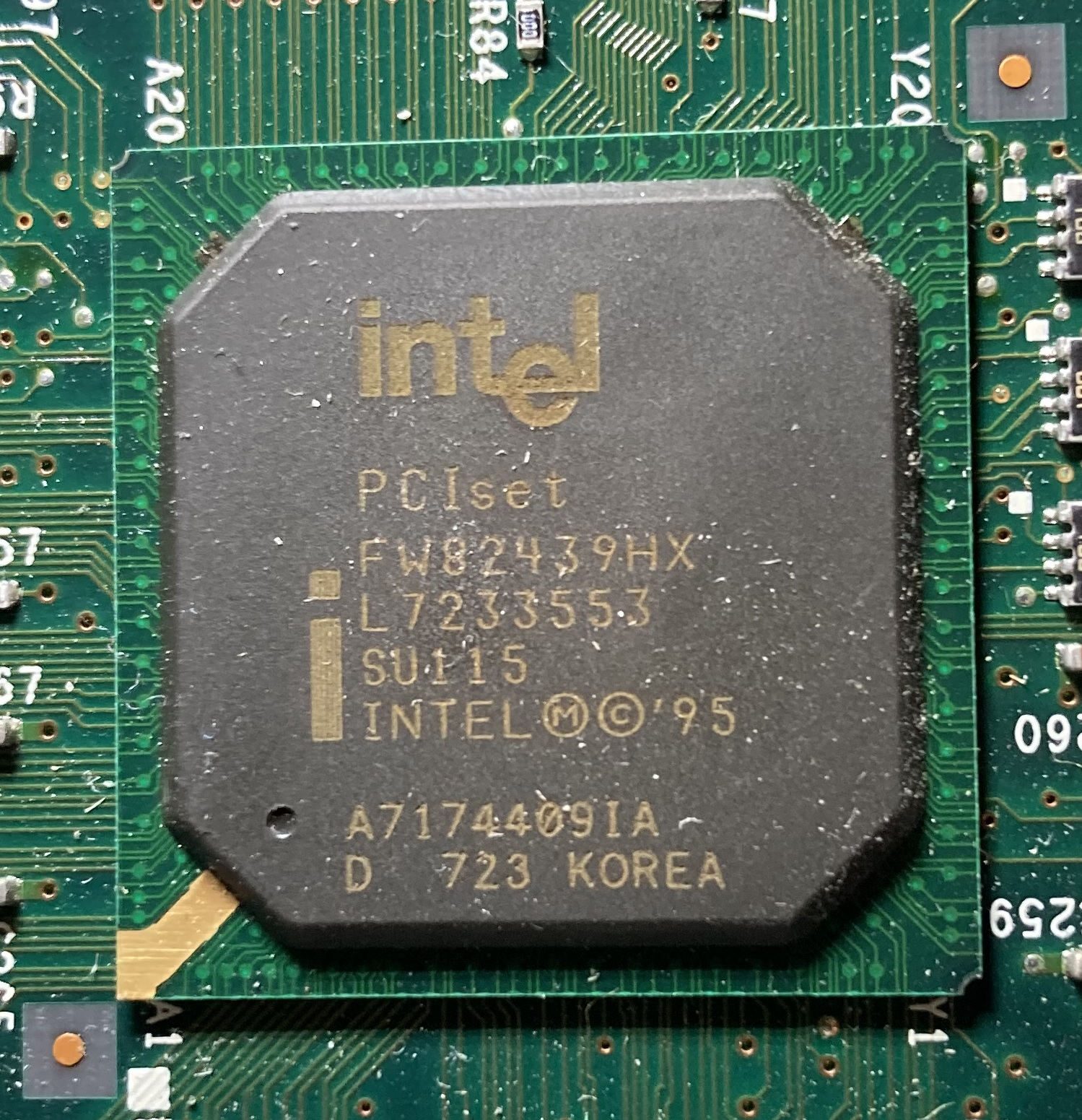
Intel FW82439HX PCIset System Controller (TXC)

== Limitations ==
Not all 430HX boards allowed for tag RAM expansion, only allowing 64MB cacheable; 430HX also did not support the then-new SDRAM memory technology. Dual-voltage support, for Pentium MMX or AMD K6 CPUs, was also not mandatory on 430HX boards, requiring the use of an interposer to step down the voltage.

== See also ==
- List of Intel chipsets
