= SBSA =

SBSA may refer to:

- Server Base System Architecture, standardized server platform for ARM processors
- Spanish Broadcasting System, radio station operator in the U.S. (NASDAQ: SBSA)
- State Bank of South Australia
- Sussex and Brighton Strategic Authority
