= PIIX =

Family of Intel southbridge microchips

PCI IDE ISA Xcelerator (PIIX), also known as Intel 82371, is a family of Intel southbridge microchips employed in some Intel chipsets. x86 virtualization implementations often support emulations of various PIIX-based chipsets.

== Versions ==
=== PIIX ===
The PIIX integrated an IDE controller with two 8237 DMA controllers, the 8254 PIT, and two 8259 PICs and a PCI to ISA bus bridge. It was introduced with the 430FX Triton chipset in 1995. The mobile version was introduced with the 430MX mobile Triton chipset.

The following variations existed:

- 82371FB (PIIX)
- 82371MX (MPIIX) Mobile

=== PIIX3 ===
The PIIX3 introduced a USB 1.0 controller and support for an external I/O APIC. It was used with the 430HX and 430VX Triton II and 440FX northbridges.

The following variations existed:

- 82371SB (PIIX3)

==== Gallery ====
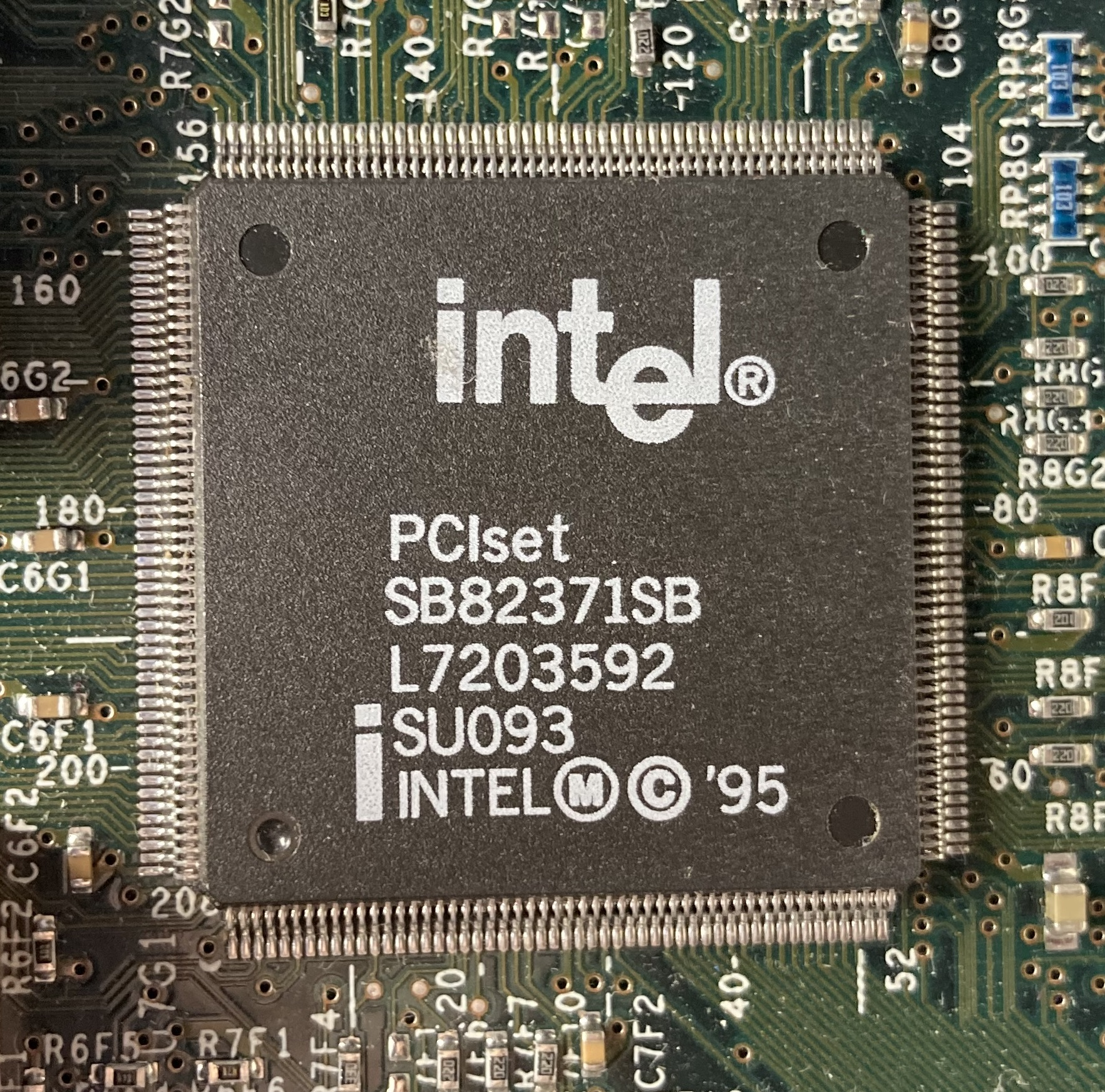
Intel SB82371SB (PIIX3)

=== PIIX4 ===
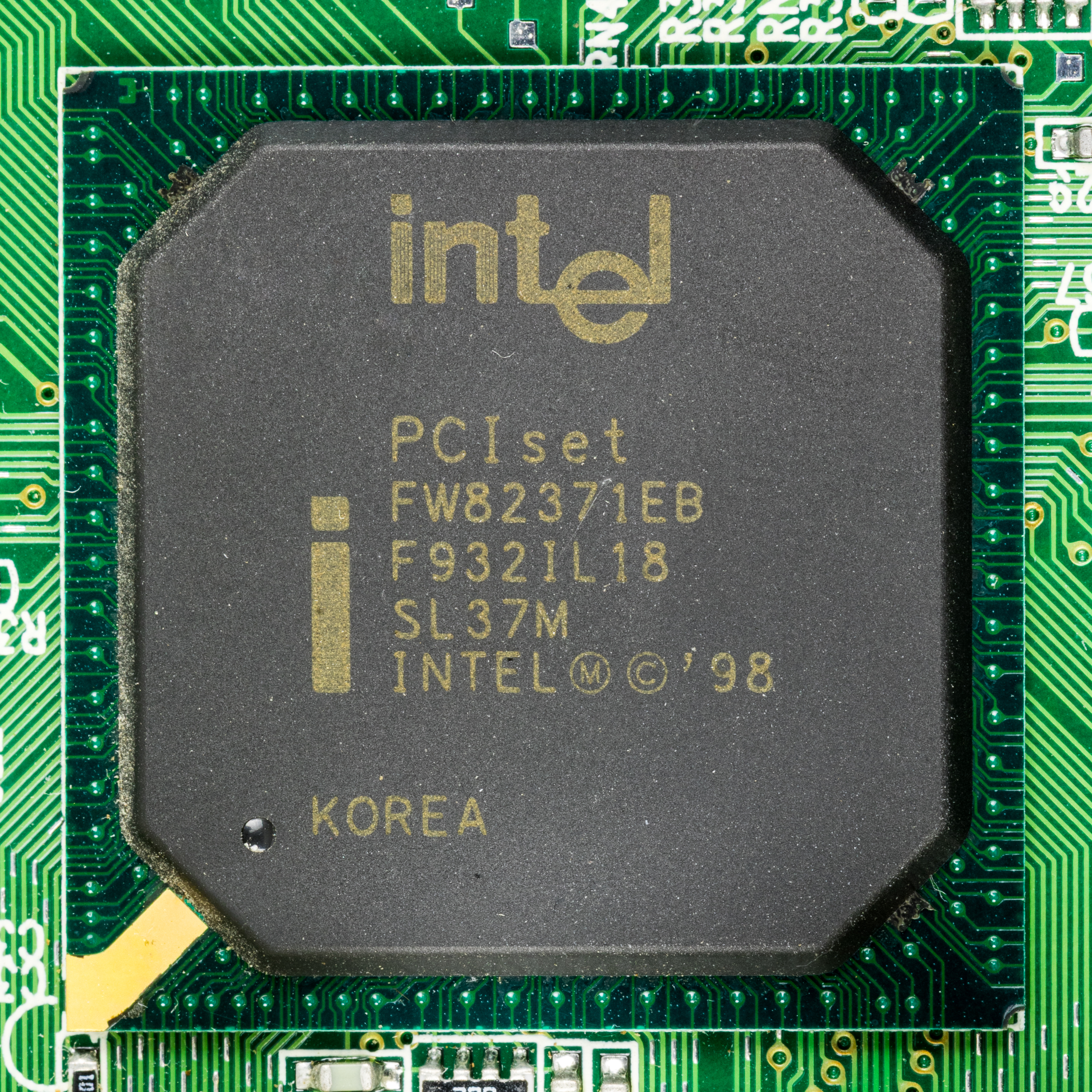
FW82371EB (PIIX4E) Enhanced

The PIIX4 introduced ACPI support, an improved IDE controller with Ultra DMA/33 support, and an integrated MC146818 style RTC and CMOS controller. It was used with the 430TX and the 440LX Balboa northbridges. The PIIX4E updated the ACPI support. It was mainly used in 440BX and 440GX chipsets but 440EX, 440ZX, and 450NX chipsets also employed it. The mobile version was used in 440BX and 440ZX-M chipsets.

The following variations existed:

- 82371AB (PIIX4) Base
- 82371EB (PIIX4E) Enhanced
- 82371MB (PIIX4M) Mobile

=== PIIX5 ===
This seems to be a reference to the Itanium 460GX I/O and Firmware Bridge (IFB) chipset component which has been referred to as 82372FB (PIIX5), 82468FB, and finally FW82468GX (IFB).

== See also ==
- List of Intel chipsets
- Platform Controller Hub (PCH)
- System Controller Hub (SCH)
- I/O Controller Hub (ICH)
- Super I/O
- Northbridge (computing)
- Southbridge (computing)

== Bibliography ==
- 82371FB (PIIX) and 82371SB (PIIX3) PCI ISA IDE Xcelerator, archived from the original on 2017-04-03
- Intel(R) 82371SB (PIIX3) PCIset Specification Update, archived from the original on 2017-01-25
- Intel(R) 82371AB PCI-TO-ISA/IDE Xcelerator (PIIX4) Datasheet (PDF), archived from the original on 2021-07-25
- Intel 82371AB PIIX4, Intel 82371EB PIIX4E and Intel 82371MB PIIX4M Specification Update (PDF), archived from the original on 2021-04-29
