= Intel 430FX =

- CPU supported: All 3V Pentium processors
- Southbridge: PIIX3

Miscellaneous
- Release date: 1995

The Intel 430FX, is a chipset from Intel, supporting all 3V Pentium processors. It is also known as i430FX and was released in 1995. Official part numbers include 82437FX, 82438FX, and 82371FB. It has a PIIX southbridge.

The Bochs emulator emulates the i430FX chipset.
