= Intel 440BX =

Chipset from Intel

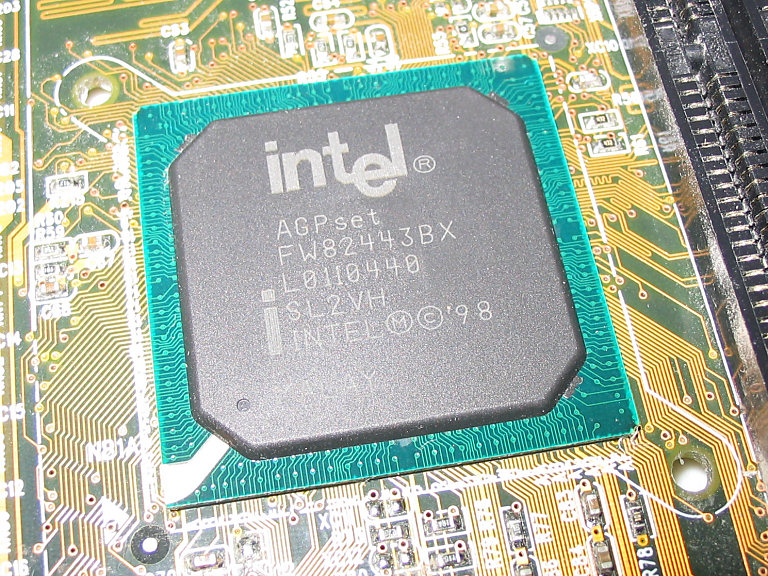
- Intel 82443BX (440BX northbridge) on an Abit BF6
- Codename: Seattle
- CPU supported: Pentium II; Pentium III; Celeron
- Socket supported: Slot 1 Socket 370
- Southbridge: Intel PIIX4

Miscellaneous
- Release date: April 1998
- Predecessor: Intel 440LX
- Successor: Intel 810; Intel 820; Intel 815

The Intel 440BX (codenamed Seattle) is a chipset from Intel, supporting Pentium II, Pentium III, and Celeron processors. It is also known as the i440BX and was released in April 1998. The official part number is 82443BX.

== Features ==
The 440BX originally supported Slot 1 and later Socket 370 Intel P6-based processors in single and SMP configurations at speeds of up to 1 GHz (and potentially up to 1.4 GHz with certain unsupported modifications, up to 1.7 GHz can be achieved using Front Side Bus speeds higher than 133 MHz and appropriate cooling). Its southbridge counterpart is the PIIX4E.

== History ==
The Intel 440BX is the third Pentium II chipset released by Intel, succeeding the 440FX and 440LX. With the new 100 MHz front side bus, Pentium II CPUs were able to scale better in performance by reducing the difference between processor clock and bus speed. The previous 66 MHz bus had become a serious bottleneck and dated back to the first Pentium "Classic" chipsets.

The 440BX had two closely related chipset peers; the 440ZX and 440MX. 440MX is a mobile chipset for laptops, although a number of notebooks did use 440BX. 440ZX is a cost-reduced version of 440BX. It has a lower maximum RAM limit resulting from having support for only 2 RAM banks. The 440ZX-66, designed for Intel Celeron processors, is limited to 66 MHz FSB speed.

The 440BX became one of Intel's most popular chipsets. Enthusiasts enjoyed its overclockability, with the chipset capable of running the front-side bus at speeds ranging from 66 MHz to well over 133 MHz, in stark contrast to the 440LX's struggle to top 75 MHz. A common overclock involved the pin-40 hack, or using an ABIT BP6 or Asus P2B, and setting the bus speed on a 66 MHz Covington or Mendocino-core Celeron to 100 MHz. The Mendocino-core Celeron 300A became a "sweet spot" for overclockers, with nearly 100% success rates at reaching 450 MHz on a 100 MHz FSB, allowing it to equate to a much more expensive Pentium II at 450 MHz. Other popular overclocks included the SL2W8-stepping Deschutes-core Pentium II that could often run to 450 MHz at 100 MHz FSB, and the SL35D Katmai-core Pentium III 450 MHz which could frequently manage 600 MHz on a 133 MHz FSB. The later Pentium III Coppermine-core processor was easily overclocked and performed well on 440BX motherboards. Finally, the unsupported Tualatin-core Pentium III could be used with an adapter and various modifications, with varying degrees of success.

Ironically, the 440BX offered better performance than several of its successors. The i810 and i820 chipsets were unable to beat the 440BX at the 100 MHz FSB speed. The i820 was plagued with a requirement for high cost RDRAM to reach good performance, along with a string of reliability issues involving an RDRAM-to-SDRAM memory translator hub in designs using that chipset with SDRAM. Unofficially, the 440BX could often be taken to 133 MHz FSB. Enthusiast motherboards, such as the Asus P3B-F and Abit BH6/BF6/BE6 series, were equipped with BIOS options to set the board to this unofficial speed. With a 133 MHz FSB, the 440BX could even match the later i815 chipset, which was designed to accommodate the final Tualatin-core Pentium III.

Unfortunately, running a 440BX above 100 MHz FSB resulted in the AGP video card being forced to run on an overclocked AGP bus, as the 440BX only had "2/3" and "1/1" bus dividers. Some video cards were tolerant of this, such as various early NVIDIA GeForce cards, but more than a few were unstable with a 35% AGP overclock. The PCI bus was not affected by this problem (there was a "1/4" bus divider for the PCI bus on the 440BX) so users could use a PCI graphics card in lieu of an AGP one. However, this inflicted a performance penalty on graphical performance since PCI has significantly lower bandwidth throughput than AGP.

Still, the later i815 was considered the best Pentium III chipset because it offered a better feature set and very similar performance relative to the 440BX. Not only did the i815 support a proper "1/2" AGP divider for the 133 MHz FSB clock rate, AGP 4x, and Ultra DMA 100, but the later revisions also directly supported the Tualatin Pentium III; however, the i815 had a RAM limit of 512MB compared to 440BX's 1GB RAM limit.

The success of the 440BX chipset has caused various software emulation and virtualization packages to use it as part of their virtual system. VMware and Microsoft Virtual PC present the Intel 440BX chipset virtually to hosted virtual machines, due to its broad compatibility.

== Limitations ==
This chipset does not support 256Mbit SDRAM, which became more common in the 2002 to 2003 period. The higher end 440GX chipset released in June 1998 that was originally intended for servers and workstations has this support.

== See also ==
- List of Intel chipsets
- MMC-2 CPU module containing 443BX chip.
- PCI IDE ISA Xcelerator
