= QMK =

Programmable keyboard open source software

- Written in: C
- Platform: Atmel AVR, ARM
- Type: Input device firmware
- License: Mostly GPLv2, but has code under MIT, Modified BSD License, Apache License, and GPLv3
- Website: qmk.fm
- Repository: https://github.com/qmk/qmk_firmware

QMK (Quantum Mechanical Keyboard) is open-source firmware for microcontrollers that control computer keyboards. The QMK Configurator is freely available software which facilitates designing keyboard layouts and then turning them into firmware files. The QMK Toolkit is freely available software which facilitates the flashing or application of firmware onto programmable keyboards.

== Tools ==
VIA is a software program that can be used to configure keyboards that run QMK. It can swap keys and implement macros into the keyboard.
