= SamyGO =

Samsung TV hacking project

SamyGO is a project that helps running custom firmware on smart TVs by Samsung. It consists of a forum which contains various methods for rooting different smart TV variants.

== Features ==
The project has implemented NFS and SMB file sharing protocols, playback from USB devices and unlocked the use of Wi-Fi dongles that is not authorized by Samsung.
