= Nonvolatile BIOS memory =

Battery-backed memory component

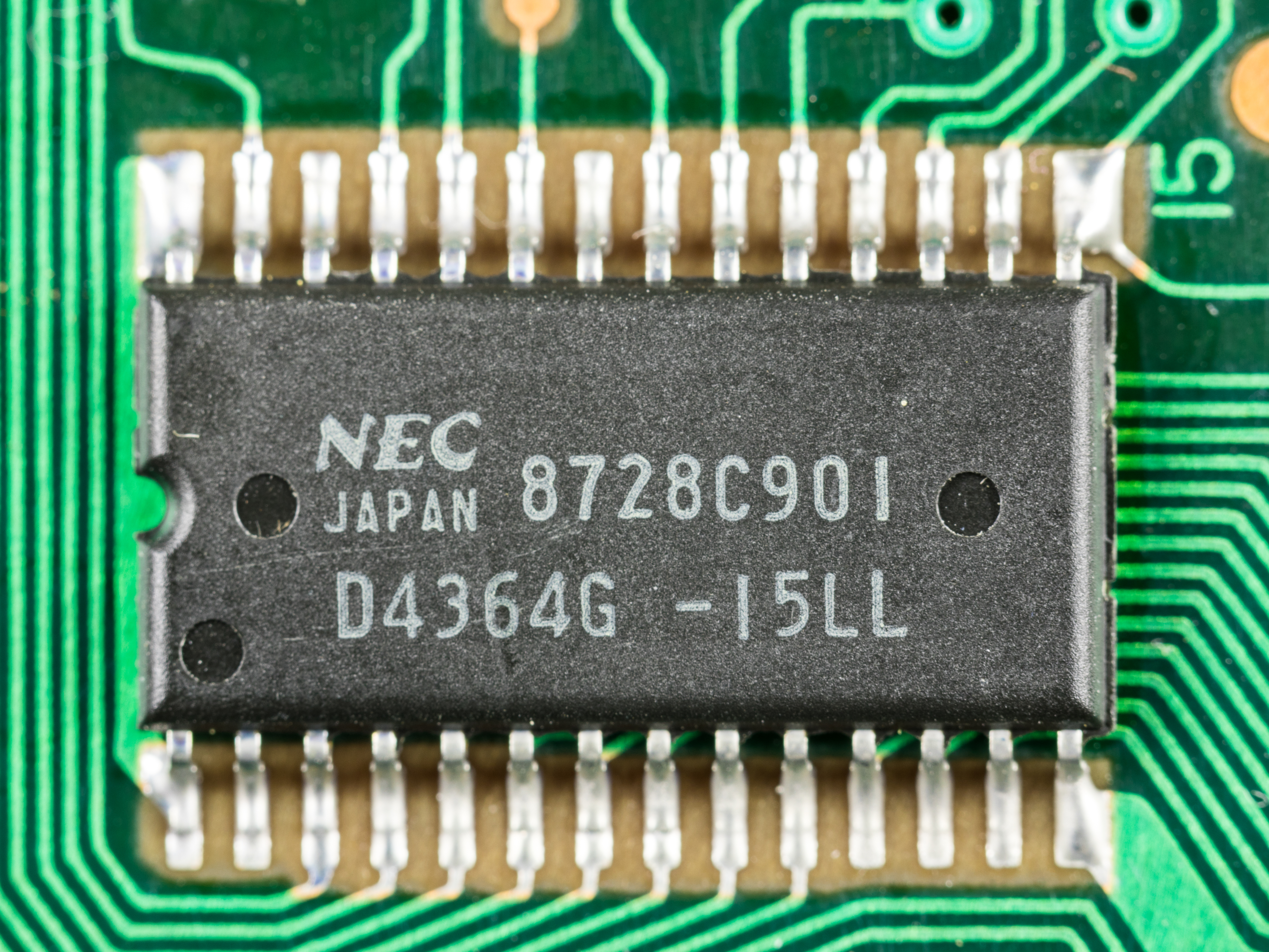
NEC D4364G 8192 x 8 Bit Static CMOS RAM

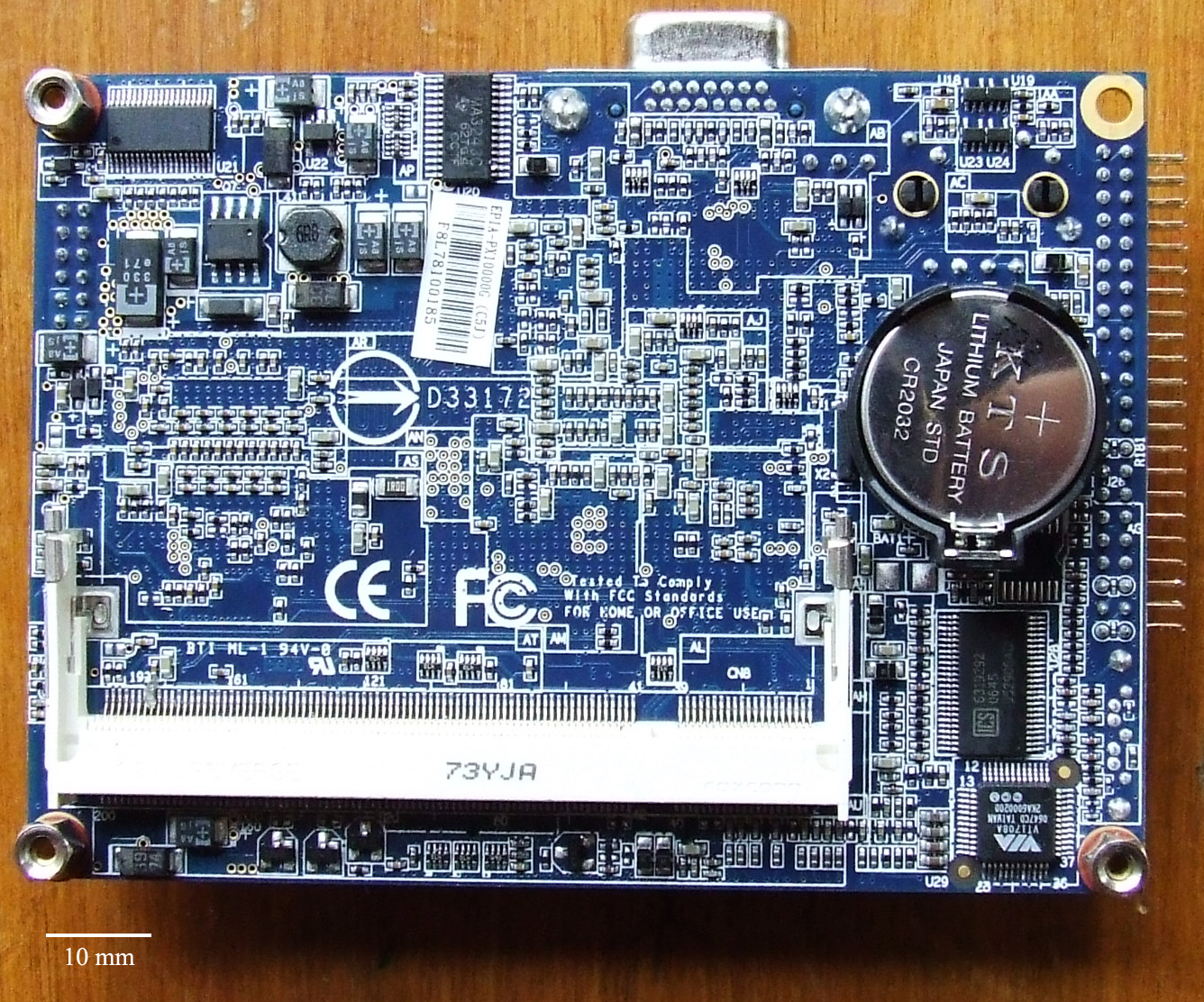
CMOS battery in a Pico ITX motherboard

Nonvolatile BIOS memory refers to a small memory on PC motherboards that is used to store BIOS settings. It is traditionally called CMOS RAM because it uses a volatile, low-power complementary metal–oxide–semiconductor (CMOS) SRAM (such as the Motorola MC146818 or similar) powered by a small battery when system and standby power is off. It is referred to as non-volatile memory or NVRAM because, after the system loses power, it does retain state by virtue of the CMOS battery. When the battery fails, BIOS settings are reset to their defaults. The battery can also be used to power a real time clock (RTC) and the RTC, NVRAM and battery may be integrated into a single component. The name CMOS memory comes from the technology used to make the memory, which is easier to say than NVRAM.

The CMOS RAM and the real-time clock have been integrated as a part of the southbridge chipset and they may not be standalone chips on modern motherboards. In turn, the southbridge has been integrated into a single Platform Controller Hub. Alternatively BIOS settings may be stored in the computer's Super I/O chip.

The chipset built-in NVRAM capacity is typically 256 bytes. For this reason, later BIOS implementations may use a small portion of BIOS flash ROM as NVRAM, to store BIOS setup and hardware configuration data.

Today's UEFI motherboards use NVRAM to store configuration data (NVRAM is a portion of the UEFI flash ROM), but by many OEMs' design, the UEFI settings are still lost if the CMOS battery fails.

Also, today's UEFI motherboards may use a portion of NVRAM to store some platform data, such as motherboard serial number and LOM MAC address, but that data will not be cleared in the normal "clear CMOS" operation.

== CMOS battery ==
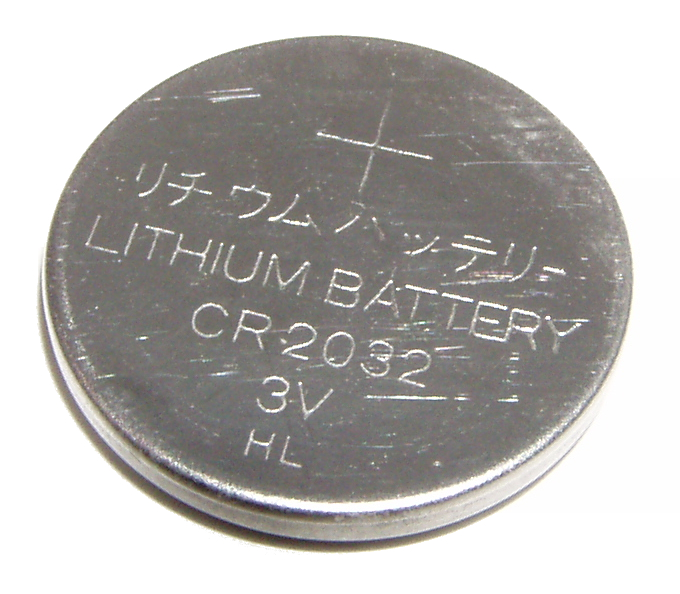
CR-2032 button cell, the most common CMOS battery

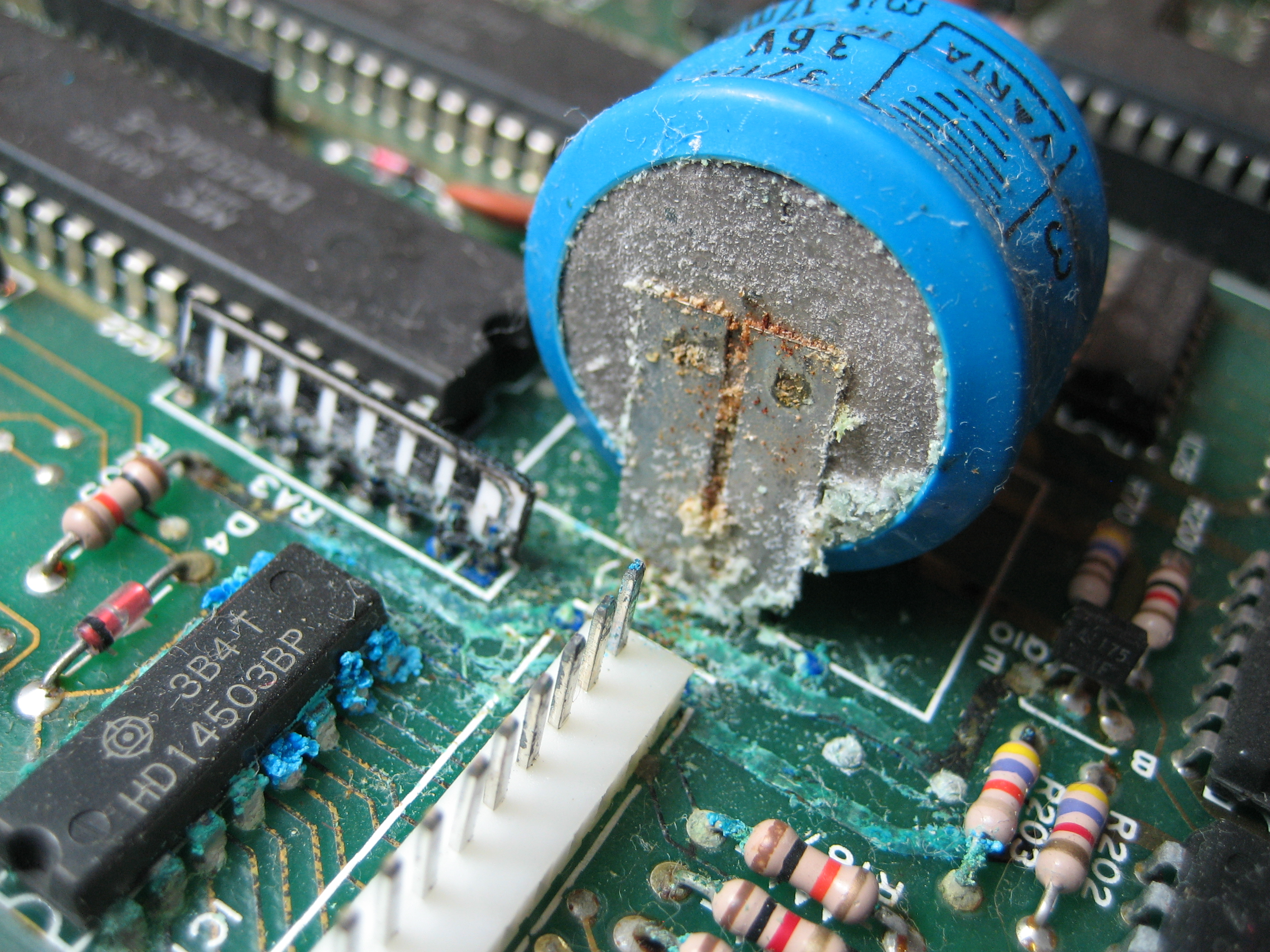
VARTA-manufactured Ni–Cd barrel battery that has leaked onto the mainboard of a synthesizer and damaged legs and traces

The memory battery (aka motherboard, CMOS, real-time clock (RTC), clock battery) is generally a CR2032 lithium coin cell. This cell battery has an estimated life of three years when power supply unit (PSU) is unplugged or when the PSU power switch is turned off. This battery type, unlike the lithium-ion battery, is not rechargeable and trying to do so may result in an explosion. Motherboards have circuitry preventing batteries from being charged and discharged when a motherboard is powered on. Other common battery cell types can last significantly longer or shorter periods, such as the smaller CR2016 which will generally last about 40% less time than CR2032. Higher temperatures and longer power-off time will shorten battery cell life. When replacing the battery cell, the system time and CMOS BIOS settings may revert to default values. Unwanted BIOS reset may be avoided by replacing the battery cell with the PSU power switch turned on and plugged into an electric wall socket. On ATX motherboards, the PSU will supply 5V standby power to the motherboard to keep CMOS memory energized while the system is off.

Some computer designs have used non-button cell batteries, such as the cylindrical "1/2 AA" used in the Power Mac G4 as well as some older IBM PC compatibles, or a 3-cell nickel–cadmium (Ni–Cd) CMOS battery that looks like a "barrel" (common in Amiga and older IBM PC compatibles), which serves the same purpose. These motherboards often have a four pin straight header, with pin 2 missing, for connecting to an external 3.6v battery, such as the Tadiran TL-5242/W, when their soldered-on batteries run out. Ni–Cd batteries have a tendency to leak devastatingly after a period of disuse, damaging components and traces on the circuit board near the battery.

== See also ==
- Extended System Configuration Data (ESCD)
- List of battery types
