= Extended System Configuration Data =

Legacy Plug and Play standard

The Extended System Configuration Data (ESCD) is a specification for configuring x86 computers of the ISA PNP era. The specification was developed by Compaq, Intel and Phoenix Technologies. It consists of a method for storing configuration information in nonvolatile BIOS memory and three BIOS functions for working with that data.

The ESCD data may at one time have been stored in the latter portion of the 128 byte extended bank of battery-backed CMOS RAM but eventually it became too large and so was moved to BIOS flash.

It contains information about ISA PnP devices is stored. It is used by the BIOS to allocate resources for devices like expansion cards. The ESCD data is stored using the data serialization format used for EISA. Its data starts with the "ACFG" signature in ASCII. PCI configuration can also be stored in ESCD, using virtual slots. Typical storage usage for ESCD data is 2–4 KB

The BIOS also updates the ESCD each time the hardware configuration changes, after deciding how to re-allocate resources like IRQ and memory mapping ranges. After the ESCD has been updated, the decision need not be made again, which thereafter results in faster startup without conflicts until the next hardware configuration change.
