= LinuxBoot =

Free software firmware project

- License: GPLv2
- Website: linuxboot.org

LinuxBoot is a free software project aimed at replacing most of the Driver Execution Environment (DXE) modules in Unified Extensible Firmware Interface (UEFI) firmware with the Linux kernel. LinuxBoot must run on top of hardware initialisation software in order to start. This can be the Pre-EFI Initialization (PEI) part of UEFI, coreboot, or U-Boot. It can boot Linux through the kexec syscall, but is also able to boot Windows with a different method.

== History ==
Originally, the project was started as NERF by Google. NERF was a stripped-down version of EFI which contains a Linux kernel and userland applications. This project has been split up into LinuxBoot (which contains the bootblock and kernel) and u-root, which contains the userland application.

LinuxBoot became an official Linux Foundation project in 2018.

== Hardware support ==
Currently, the EFI support of LinuxBoot is limited to a few servers:

- Dell R630
- Open Compute Project Winterfell, Leopard, Monolake and Tioga Pass
- Intel S2600WF

LinuxBoot is in theory also supported on all the mainboards that are supported by the coreboot project, which does include the OCP Monolake. In practice, the support is limited due to flash size constraints.
