= CH341A =

EEPROM Programmer

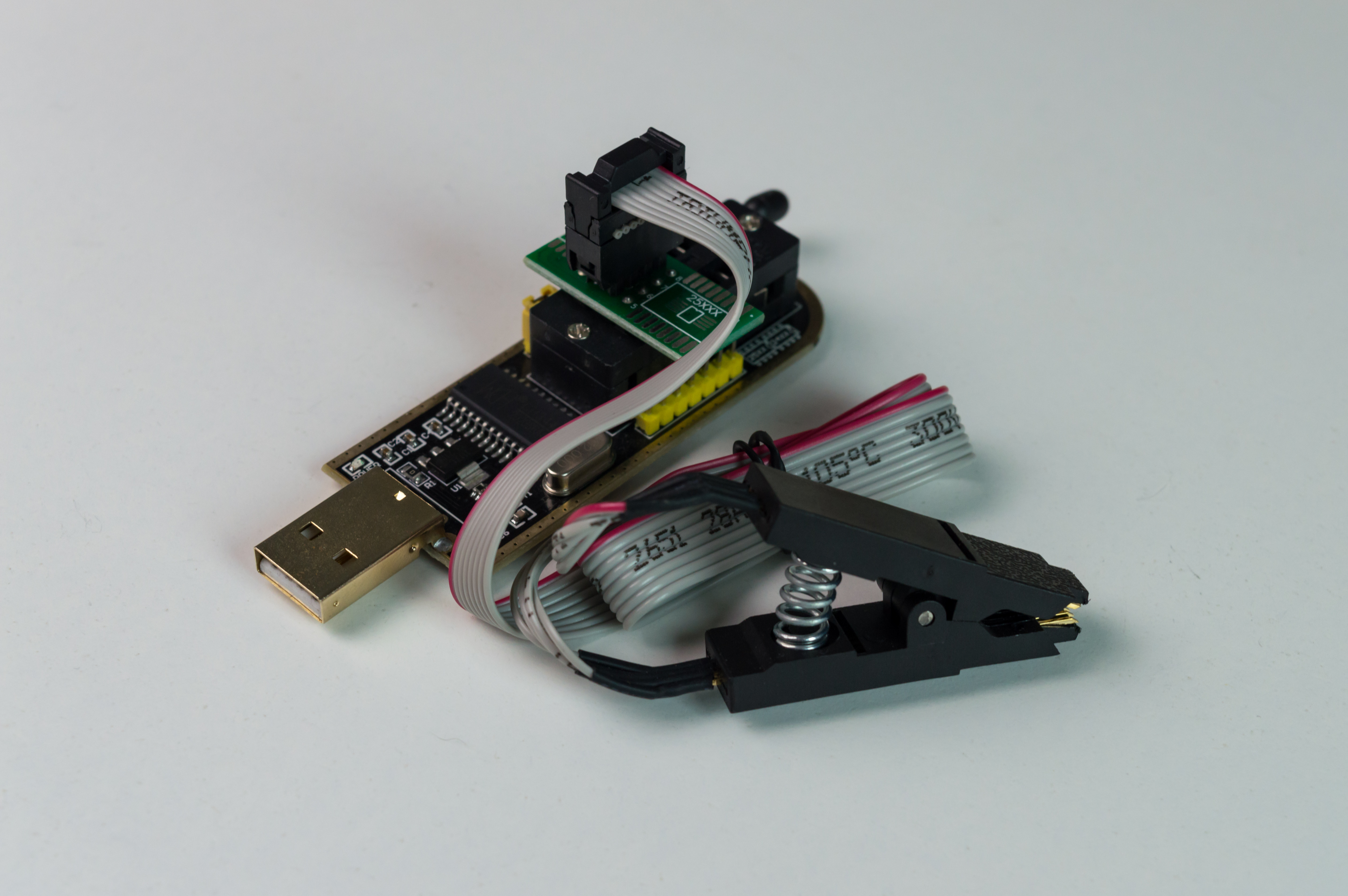
- Type: Dongle

CH341A-based programmers are cheap USB dongles usually used for reprogramming SPI chips. SPI EEPROM chips are found in many electronic devices.

== Risks ==
CH341A programmers usually only output 5 V. If used with chips that require 3.3 V on the data lines, it could irreversibly break them. Some BIOS chips, for example, require 3.3 V. For a safer alternative, see the Raspberry Pi Pico.

== See also ==
- SOIC
- DIP
- Serial communication
