= Server Base System Architecture =

The Server Base System Architecture (SBSA) is a hardware system architecture for servers based on 64-bit ARM processors.

== Rationale ==
Historically, ARM-based products have often been tailored for specific applications and power profiles. Variation between ARM-based hardware platforms has been an impediment requiring operating system adjustments for each product.

The SBSA seeks to strengthen the ARM ecosystem by specifying a minimal set of standardized features so that an OS built for this standard platform should function correctly without modification on all hardware products compliant with the specification.

== Features ==
- CPU features
- Memory management
- Peripheral access
- Interrupts
- Watchdog (errant system detection)

Existing specifications for USB, PCIe, ACPI, TPM, and other standards are incorporated to solidify the specification.

=== Server Base Boot Requirements ===
Firmware issues are addressed separately in the Server Base Boot Requirements (SBBR) specification.

== Platform validation ==
The Architecture Compliance Suite (ACS) checks whether an environment is compliant with the SBSA specification, and is provided under an Apache 2 open source license. It is available at https://github.com/ARM-software/sbsa-acs.

== Compliance levels ==
The specification defines levels of compliance, with level 0 being the most basic, and successive levels building on prior levels. In the words of the spec, "Unless explicitly stated, all specification items belonging to level N apply to levels greater than N."

=== Level 0, 1, and 2 ===
Levels 0, 1, and 2 have been deprecated and folded into level 3.

=== Level 3 ===
Level 3 contains base-level specifications for:

- PE (Processing Element--a core) features
- Memory map
- Interrupt controller
- PPI (peripheral interrupt) assignments
- MMU behavior
- Clock and timer subsystem
- Wake up semantics
- Power state semantics
- Watchdogs
- Peripheral subsystems

=== Level 4 ===
Extends level 3, e.g. with support for RAS fault recovery extensions of ARMv8.2 spec.

=== Level 5 ===
Extends level 4, e.g. with support for stage 2 translation control from hypervisor as specified in ARMv8.4.

=== Level 6 ===
Extends level 5, e.g. with support for speculative execution safety features.

=== Level 7 ===
Extends level 6, e.g. with support for Arm Memory System Resource Partitioning and Monitoring (MPAM) and Performance Monitoring Unit (PMU) features.

== Versions ==
=== Initial public version ===
Initial public version of the SBSA was announced on January 29, 2014.

=== SBSA Version 3.0 ===
SBSA Version 3.0 was released on February 1, 2016.

=== SBSA Version 5.0 ===
SBSA Version 5.0 was released on May 30, 2018.

=== SBSA Version 6.0 ===
SBSA Version 6.0 was released on September 16, 2019.

=== SBSA Version 6.1 ===
SBSA Version 6.1 was released on September 15, 2020.

=== SBSA Version 7.0 ===
SBSA Version 7.0 was released on January 31, 2021.

=== SBSA Version 7.1 ===
SBSA Version 7.1 was released on October 6, 2022.

== See also ==
- UEFI
- ACPI
