= MultiProcessor Specification =

Open standard for x86 multi-processors

The MultiProcessor Specification (MPS) for the x86 architecture is an open standard describing enhancements to both operating systems and firmware, which will allow them to work with x86-compatible processors in a multi-processor configuration. MPS covers Advanced Programmable Interrupt Controller (APIC) architectures.

Version 1.1 of the specification was released on April 11, 1994. Version 1.4 of the specification was released on July 1, 1995, which added extended configuration tables to improve support for multiple PCI bus configurations and improve expandability.

The Linux kernel and FreeBSD are known to support the Intel MPS. Windows NT 4.0 is known to support MPS 1.1 and, through later Service Packs, also MPS 1.4. Windows 2000 or higher are known to support MPS 1.4. OS/2 is known to support MPS 1.1 only. Mac OS X is known to support MPS 1.4 only.

There is a utility called 'mptable' which can be used to examine the MPS table on motherboards.

Since most newer machines support Advanced Configuration and Power Interface (ACPI) which subsumes the MPS functionality, MPS has for the most part been supplanted by ACPI. MPS can still be useful on machines or with operating systems that do not support ACPI.
