= Texas Instruments AR7 =

ADSL modem chip

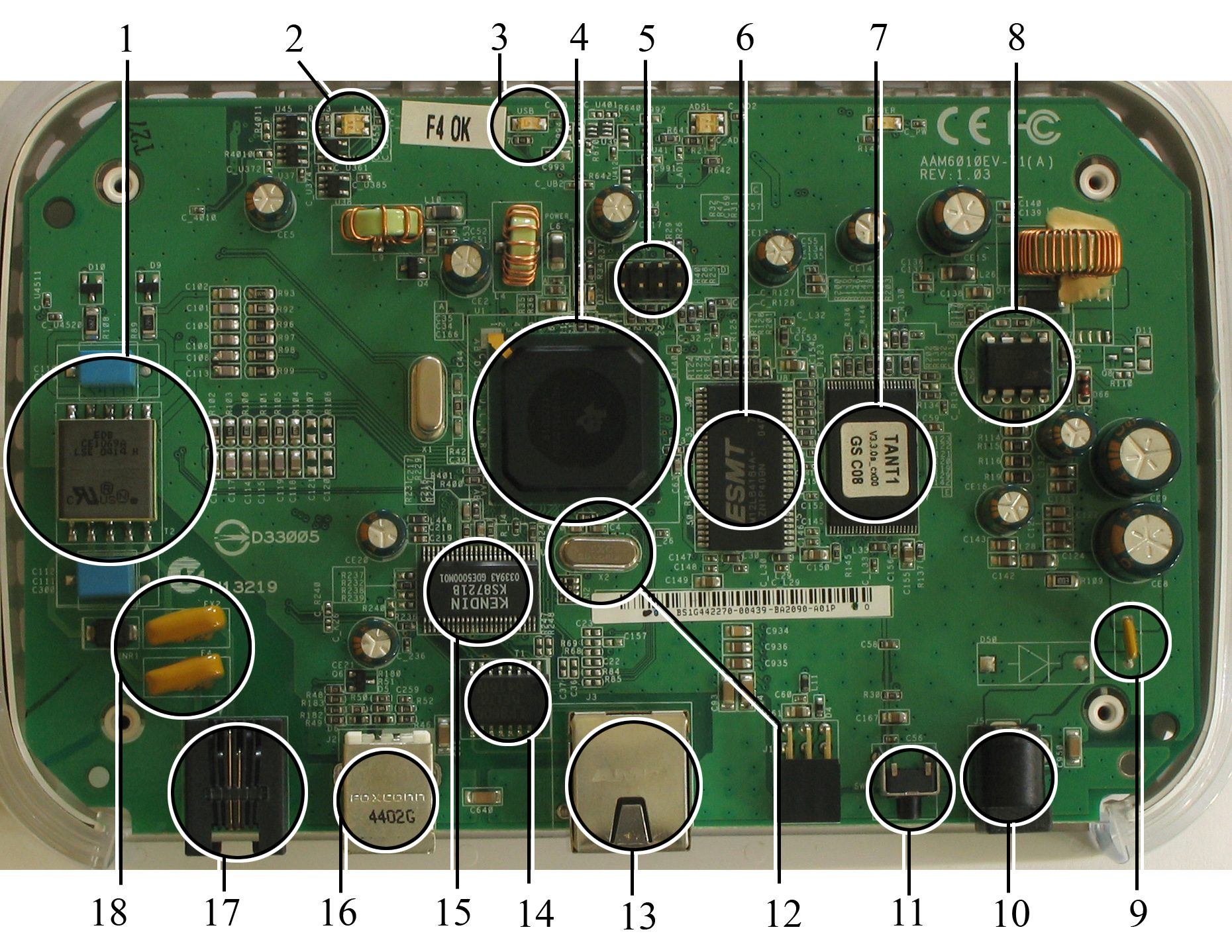
ADSL router with TI AR7 chip as central processor.

The Texas Instruments AR7 or TI-AR7 is a fully integrated single-chip ADSL CPE access router solution. The AR7 combines a MIPS32 processor, a DSP-based digital transceiver, and an ADSL analog front end.

== Ownership history ==
In 2007, TI sold its DSL business to Infineon.

In 2009, Infineon Technologies spins off its wireline division to Lantiq.

On November 6, 2009, Lantiq announced that it became a standalone company.

== Features ==
- Integrated high performance MIPS 4KEc 32-Bit RISC processor
- ADSL PHY subsystem based on TI C62x DSP, with integrated transceiver, codec, line driver, and line receiver
- Hardware accelerated ATM Segmentation and Reassembly (SAR)
- Integrated IEEE 802.3 PHY
- Two IEEE 802.3 MACs with integrated media-independent interface (MII) and Quality of Service (QoS)
- Integrated USB 1.1 compliant transceiver (slave only)
- Two VLYNQ interfaces for compatible high-speed expansion devices
- Two 16c550 compatible UARTs
- EJTAG, GPIO and "Flexible Serial Interface" (FSER) interfaces
- 4 KiB PROM (0xBFC00000) and 4KiB RAM (0x80000000) on the chip for boot purposes
- Physical package of a 324 BGA with 1.0-mm ball pitch

== Options ==
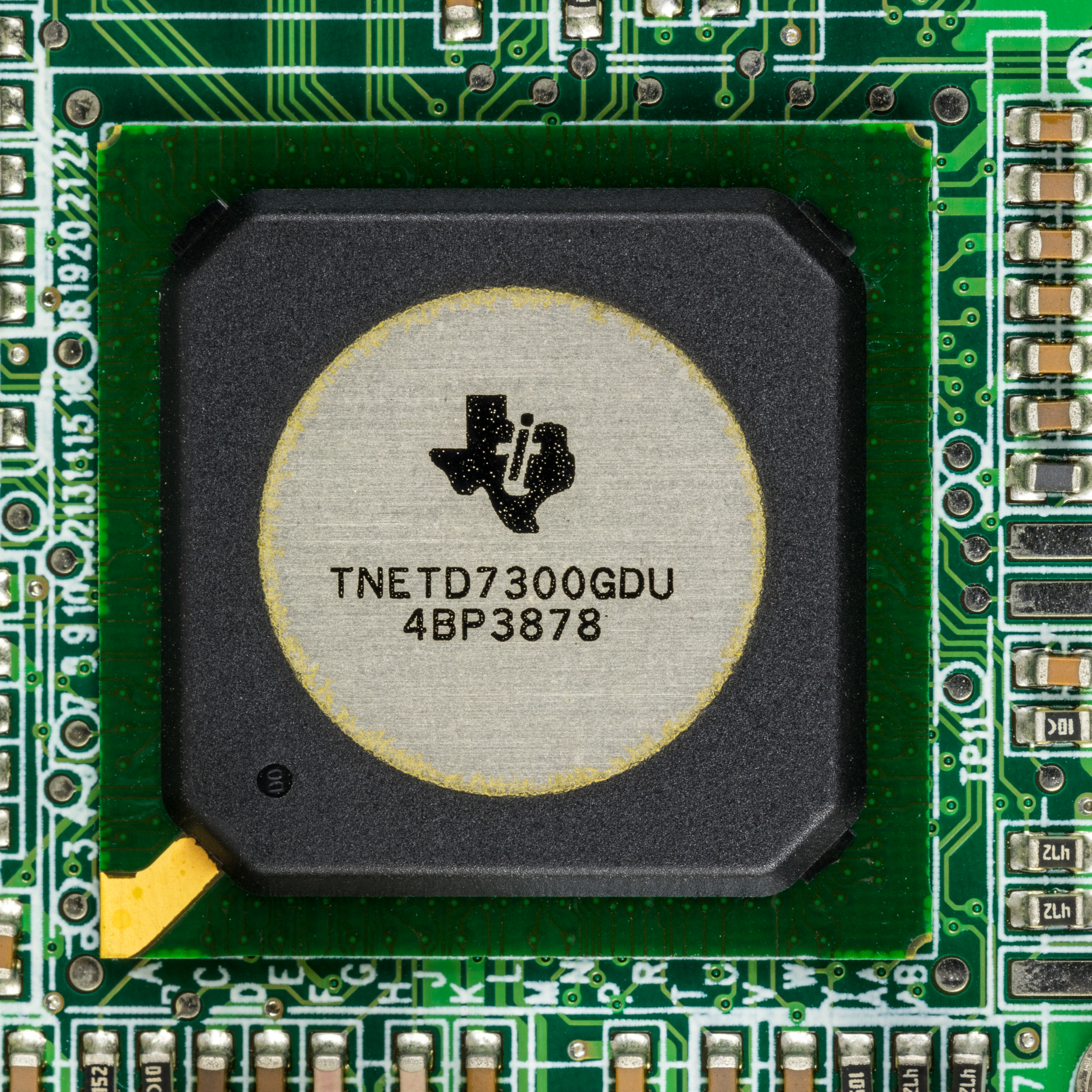
- Texas Instruments TNETD7300GDU
  AR7DB
- AR7RD
- AR7WRD (TNETD7300GDU) is an AR7 option with an interface for WiFi card.
- AR7VWI : DSL + VoIP + Wireless
- AR7VW
- AR7WI
- AR7V : DSL + VoIP
- The Adam2 bootloader
- The Pspboot bootloader

Devices based on the Texas Instruments AR7

- Actiontec GT701
- Acorp W400G/W422G
- Asus AAM6010EV : TNETD7300GDU, 2Mb FLASH, 8Mb SDRAM
- AVM Fritz!Box
- Aztech DSL-600E: 2Mb FLASH, 8Mb SDRAM
- Aztech DSL600ER: 2Mb FLASH, 8Mb SDRAM, 88E6060 Switch
- Aztech DSL600EW: 4Mb FLASH, 16Mb SDRAM, 88E6060 Switch, TNETW1130
- D-Link DSL-xxxT (like 300T)
- D-Link DVA-G3342SB (DSL board only)
- ECI B-FOCuS combo 352+, B-FOCuS Router 312+A
- devolo dsl+ 1100 duo, dsl+ 1100 LAN
- Efficient Networks, Inc / ENI SpeedStream 5100
- Huawei WA1003A
- LevelOne FBR-1416A: 2Mb FLASH, 8Mb SDRAM, 88E6060 Switch
- Linksys ADSL2MUE 4MB Flash, 16MB ram, USB + 1 Ethernet only
- Linksys AG241
- Linksys WAG200Gv1
- Linksys WAG54Gv2 and v3
- Linksys WAG354Gv1, v2, and v2.1
- Linksys HG200
- Netgear DG834(G) (Version 1, 2, and 3 have AR7 Chipset; version 4 has Broadcom chipset)
- Paradyne (Zhone Technologies) Hotwire 6210-A2, 6211-A2, and 6381-A2 (OEM Asus AAM6010EV)
- Pluscom AWR-7200
- Safecom SWART2-54125
- Shiro DSL805(E/EU/EW)
- Siemens SX541 uses real-time OS (SOHO.BIN) and BRN Boot Loader from the Broad Net Technology, Inc.
- Siemens SpeedStream 4100/4200/5620/SE567
- Sitecom WL-108
- Surecom 9410SX-g
- Solwise ADSL-SAR-600E/SAR600EW/SAR605EW
- Sphairon Turbolink JDR454WB WLAN ADSL Modem (2548 937939)
- T-Com Sinus 154 DSL SE
- T-Com Sinus 154 DSL Basic SE
- T-Com Sinus 154 DSL Basic 3
- T-Com Speedport W501V
- T-Com Speedport W701V
- TRENDnet TEW-435BRM v1
- Westell WireSpeed 2000 and ProLine 6100
- ZyXEL Prestige 660 Series ADSL 2+ Modem/Router - Prestige 660M-67 (Arcor-DSL Speed-Modem 50Z)
- 3Com Officeconnect 3crwdr100x series 3Com 3rcwdr100x series ADSL firewall router

Third-party firmware

- RouterTech has released open source firmware.
- OpenWrt has open source firmware in development, available for testing.
- DGTeam
