= Intel 440FX =

Computer chipset

- Codename(s): Natoma
- CPU supported: Pentium Pro; Pentium II; Celeron
- Socket supported: Socket 8 Slot 1 Socket 370
- Southbridge(s): Intel PIIX3

Miscellaneous
- Release date(s): May 1996
- Predecessor: Intel 450KX
- Successor: Intel 440LX

The Intel 440FX (codenamed Natoma), is a chipset from Intel, supporting the Pentium Pro and Pentium II processors. It is the first chipset from Intel that supports Pentium II. It is also known as i440FX and was released in May 1996. Official part numbers include the 82441FX and the 82442FX.

The 440FX chipset does not support UltraDMA, SDRAM, or AGP. The chipset contains the northbridge chip "440FX PCIset - 82441FX PCI and Memory Controller (PMC)" and the data bus accelerator (DBX) "82442FX". Its southbridge counterpart is the PIIX3.

It was replaced by Intel 440LX.

The designers of the QEMU emulator originally chose to simulate this chipset and its southbridge counterpart PIIX3.

== Gallery ==
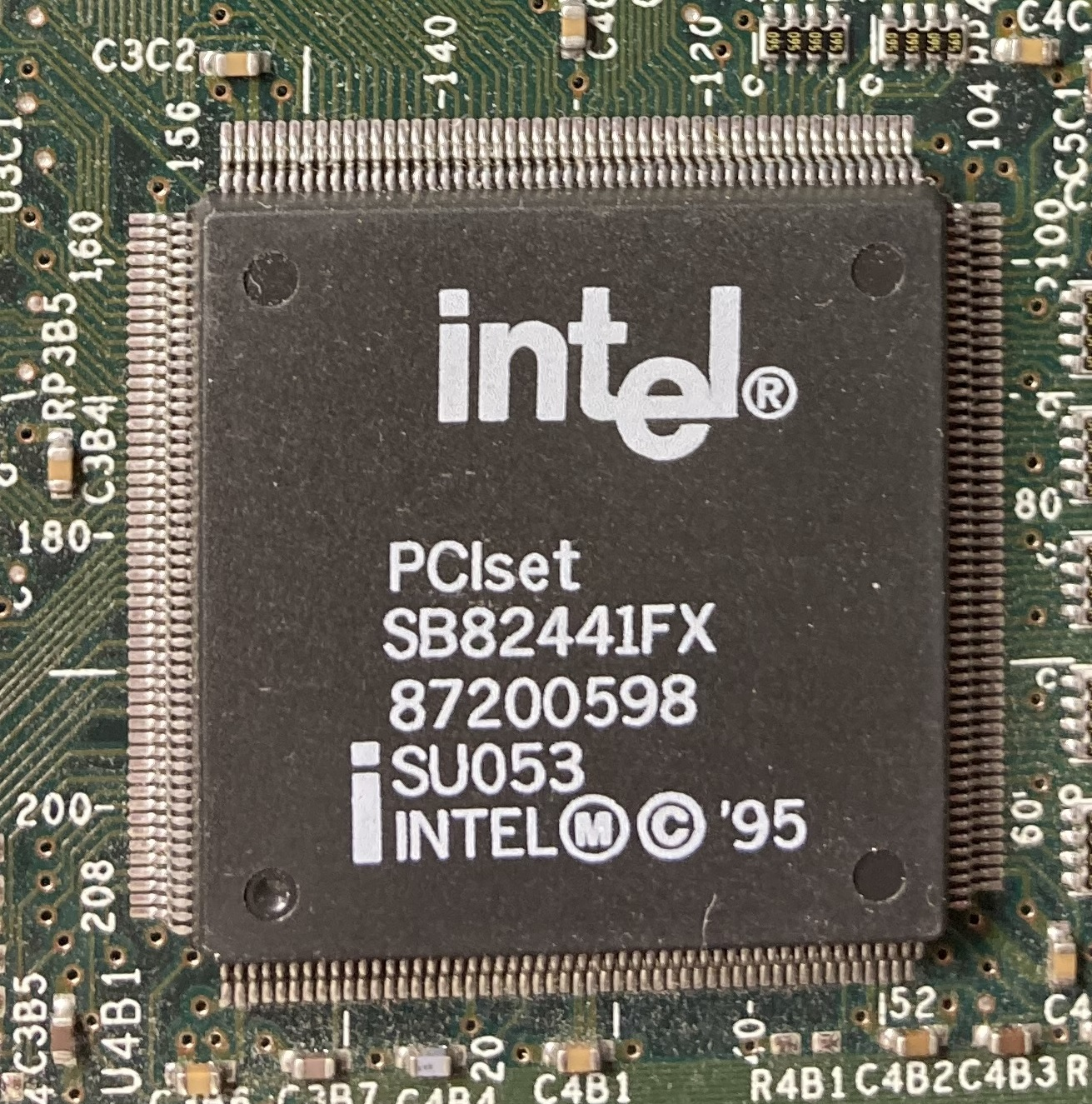
Intel 82441FX PCI and Memory Controller (PMC)

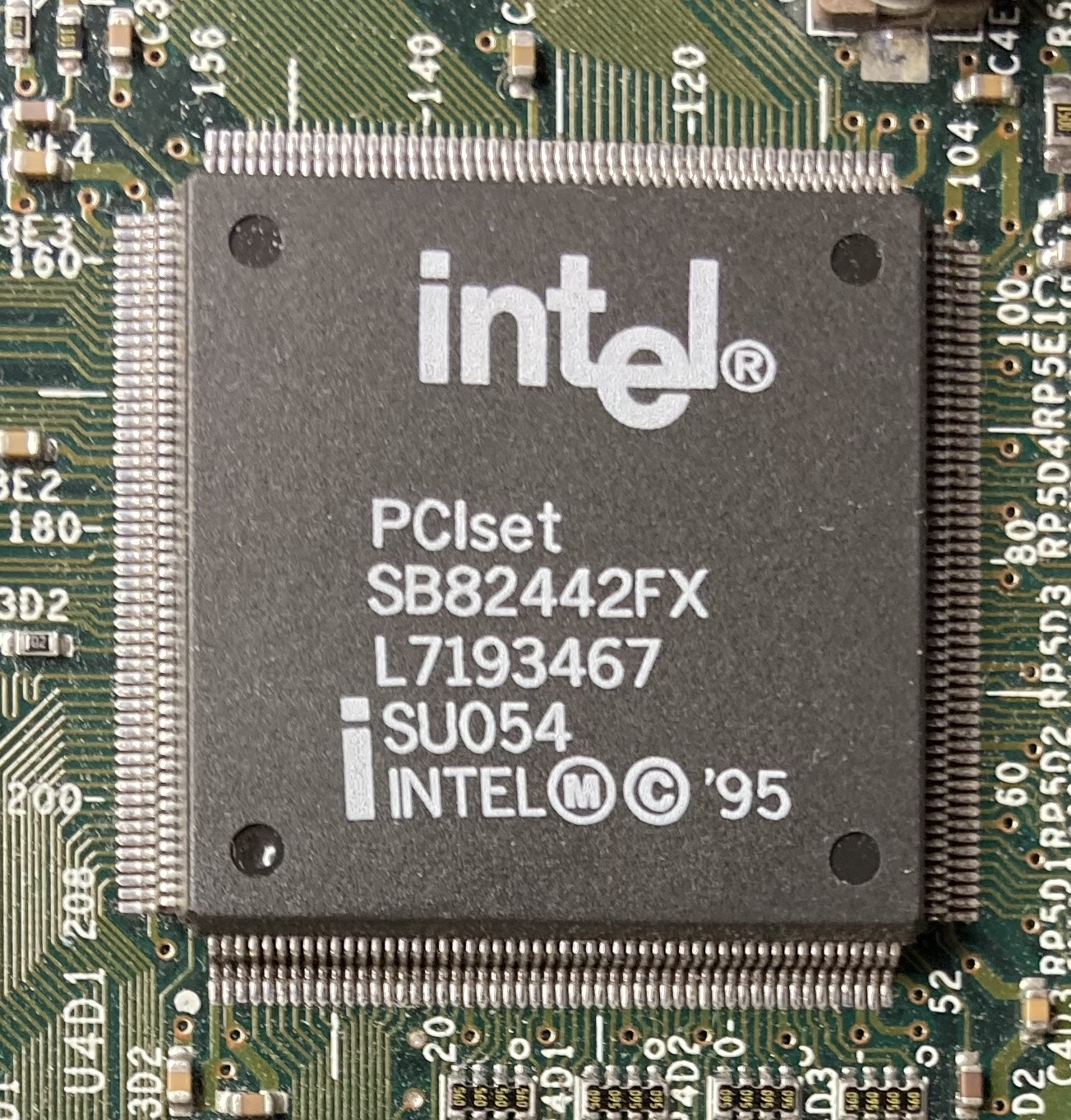
Intel 82442FX Data Bus Accelerator (DBX)

== See also ==
- PCI bus bridges
- List of Intel chipsets
