= UEFI Forum =

Non-profit trade organization based in Oregon

The Unified Extensible Firmware Interface Forum
- Type: Collaborative trade organization
- Industry: Firmware
- Founded: 2005
- Headquarters: Beaverton, Oregon, United States
- Key people: Mark Doran, Dong Wei, Michael Rothman, Vincent Zimmer
- Products: Specifications
- Website: www.uefi.org

UEFI Forum, Inc. is an alliance between technology companies to coordinate the development of the UEFI specifications. The board of directors includes representatives from twelve promoter companies: AMD, American Megatrends, ARM, Apple, Dell, Hewlett Packard Enterprise, HP Inc., Insyde Software, Intel, Lenovo, Microsoft, and Phoenix Technologies.

== Overview ==
The non-profit corporation has assumed responsibility for the management and promotion of the Unified Extensible Firmware Interface (UEFI) specification, a bootloader and runtime interface between platform firmware and an operating system. The original EFI specification was developed by Intel and was used as the starting point from which the UEFI versions were developed. The goal of the organization is to replace the aging PC BIOS.

In addition to the UEFI specification, the forum is responsible for a UEFI Platform Initialization (PI) specification, which addresses the firmware internal architecture as well as firmware-to-hardware interfaces. The forum also is responsible for Self-Certification Test suites, which defines conformance to the specifications that it defines.

In October 2013, the Advanced Configuration and Power Interface (ACPI) assets have also been transferred into the forum. The forum is responsible for the management and promotion of future ACPI specifications, which provides static tables at boot time and dynamic control methods as the primary runtime interfaces between the OS and system firmware for system configuration, power management and RAS (Reliability, Availability and Supportability) features. ACPI "Revision 5.0" is used as the starting point from which future ACPI versions will be developed.

== Published specifications ==
- UEFI Specification version 2.8, published March, 2019
- UEFI Shell Specification version 2.2, published January 26, 2016
- UEFI Platform Initialization Specification version 1.7, published January, 2019
- UEFI Platform Initialization Distribution Packaging Specification version 1.1, published January, 2016
- ACPI Specification version 6.4, published January 2021

== Obsolete specifications ==
- UEFI Specification version 2.0, 2.1, 2.2
- UEFI Platform Initialization Specification version 1.0, 1.1

== See also ==
- TianoCore EDK II
- ACPI Component Architecture (ACPICA)
- Distributed Management Task Force (DMTF)
