= LogoFAIL =

Vulnerability in computer motherboard firmware

CVE-2023-40238
- CVSS 3.x score: 5.5
- CVSS 3.x vector: CVSS:3.1/AV:L/AC:L/PR:L/UI:N/S:U/C:N/I:N/A:H
- Discoverer: Binarly
- Affected hardware: Motherboard firmware with TianoCore EDK II, including Insyde InsydeH2O, AMI Aptio, and Phoenix SCT firmware

LogoFAIL is a security vulnerability and exploit thereof that affects computer motherboard firmware with TianoCore EDK II, including Insyde Software's InsydeH2O modules and similar code in AMI and Phoenix firmware, which are commonly found on both Intel and AMD motherboards, and which enable loading of custom boot logos. The exploit was discovered in December 2023 by researchers at Binarly.

== Description ==
The vulnerability exists when the Driver Execution Environment (DXE) is active after a successful Power On Self Test (POST) in the UEFI firmware (also known as the BIOS). The UEFI's boot logo is replaced with the exploit payload at this point, and the exploit can then take control of the system.

== Patches ==
Intel patched the issue in Intel Management Engine (ME) version 16.1.30.2307 in December 2023. AMD addressed the problem in AGESA version 1.2.0.b, although some motherboard manufacturers did not include the fix under AGESA 1.2.0.c.
