= Developing Solutions, Inc =

Independent software vendor

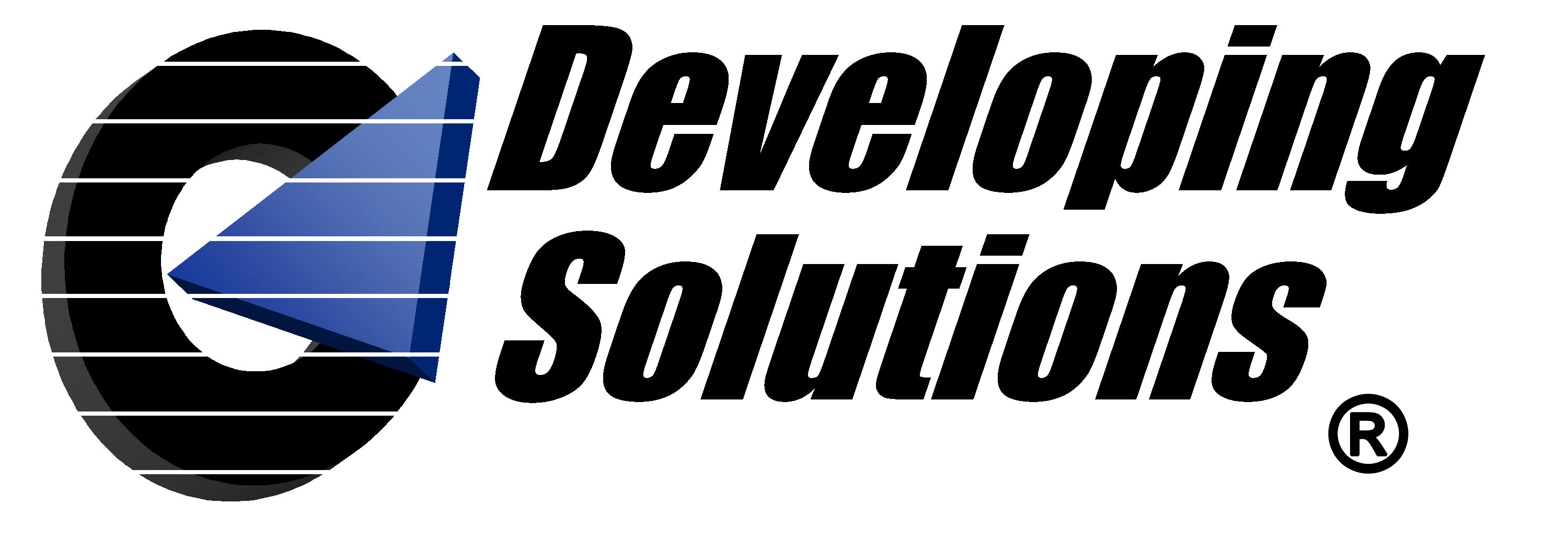
- Company type: Private
- Industry: Telecommunications; Wireless networking Security testing
- Founded: 2002
- Products: Network diagnostics Load testing Conformance testing See product listing
- Website: www.developingsolutions.com

Developing Solutions, Inc. was an independent software vendor (ISV) that provided application and network test products. Privately held, and headquartered in the Dallas-Fort Worth metroplex, Developing Solutions served telecommunications service providers and original equipment manufacturers (OEM).

== Products ==
In 2009, the company announced dsTest, a software-based system for testing network interfaces and features in the core packet network for 3G, 4G, and 5G wireless networks. In 2013, it announced dsAnalyzer, a software product for analyzing traffic flows between wireless core packet network nodes and for automating dsTest test case generation.

dsTest has been used to test vendor network equipment by an independent testing organization.

== Acquisition ==
On 22 June 2021 it was announced that Developing Solutions had been acquired by long-standing partner Mobileum. Terms were not disclosed.
