= Black Lotus =

Black Lotus may refer to:

== Music ==
- Black Lotus, a demo album of the Sonic Syndicate
- Black Lotus (Sister Sin album)
- Black Lotus (Guntzepaula album), 2016
- Black Lotus Records, an independent record label based in Greece

== Fiction ==
=== Novels ===
- Black Lotus (novel), a 2001 murder mystery by Laura Joh Rowland set in 17th-century Japan

=== Media ===
- Blade Runner: Black Lotus, an animated television series
- Black Lotus, a 2023 film starring Rico Verhoeven and Frank Grillo

=== Organisations ===
- Black Lotus Tong, a fictional criminal syndicate from the Sherlock episode "The Blind Banker"
- Black Lotus, a fictional organization from the AMC television series Into the Badlands

=== Characters ===
- Black Lotus, a member of the Femizons in the Marvel Universe
- Black Lotus, a fictional character from the series Accel World
- Black Lotus, a character played by Angela Fong in the professional wrestling series Lucha Underground
- Black Lotus, the daughter of the Mirror Master in the 2023 comic book limited series Nemesis: Reloaded

== Other uses ==
- Black Lotus (Magic: The Gathering), one of the most valuable Magic: The Gathering cards
- Black Lotus (company), in the information security industry
- Bhakti Tirtha Swami or Black Lotus (1950–2005), spiritual leader
- BlackLotus, a Windows based malware
