= UEFI Platform Initialization =

Specification that describes parts of firmware

The Platform Initialization Specification (PI Specification) is a specification published by the Unified EFI Forum that describes the internal interfaces between different parts of computer platform firmware. This allows for more interoperability between firmware components from different sources. This specification is normally, but not by requirement, used in conjunction with the UEFI specification.

The latest version of PI is 1.9, released in December 2024.

== Contents ==
As of version 1.9, the PI specification contains five volumes:

- Volume 1: Pre-EFI Initialization Core Interface
- Volume 2: Driver Execution Environment Core Interface
- Volume 3: Shared Architectural Elements
- Volume 4: System Management Mode Core Interface
- Volume 5: Standards
