= TouchStone Software =

TouchStone Software Corporation, Inc.
- Type: Private since 2010
- Industry: Software
- Founded: 1982; 44 years ago in Seal Beach, California, United States
- Headquarters: Marco Island, Florida, United States
- Parent: Phoenix Technologies (2008–2010)
- Website: www.touchstonesoftware.com

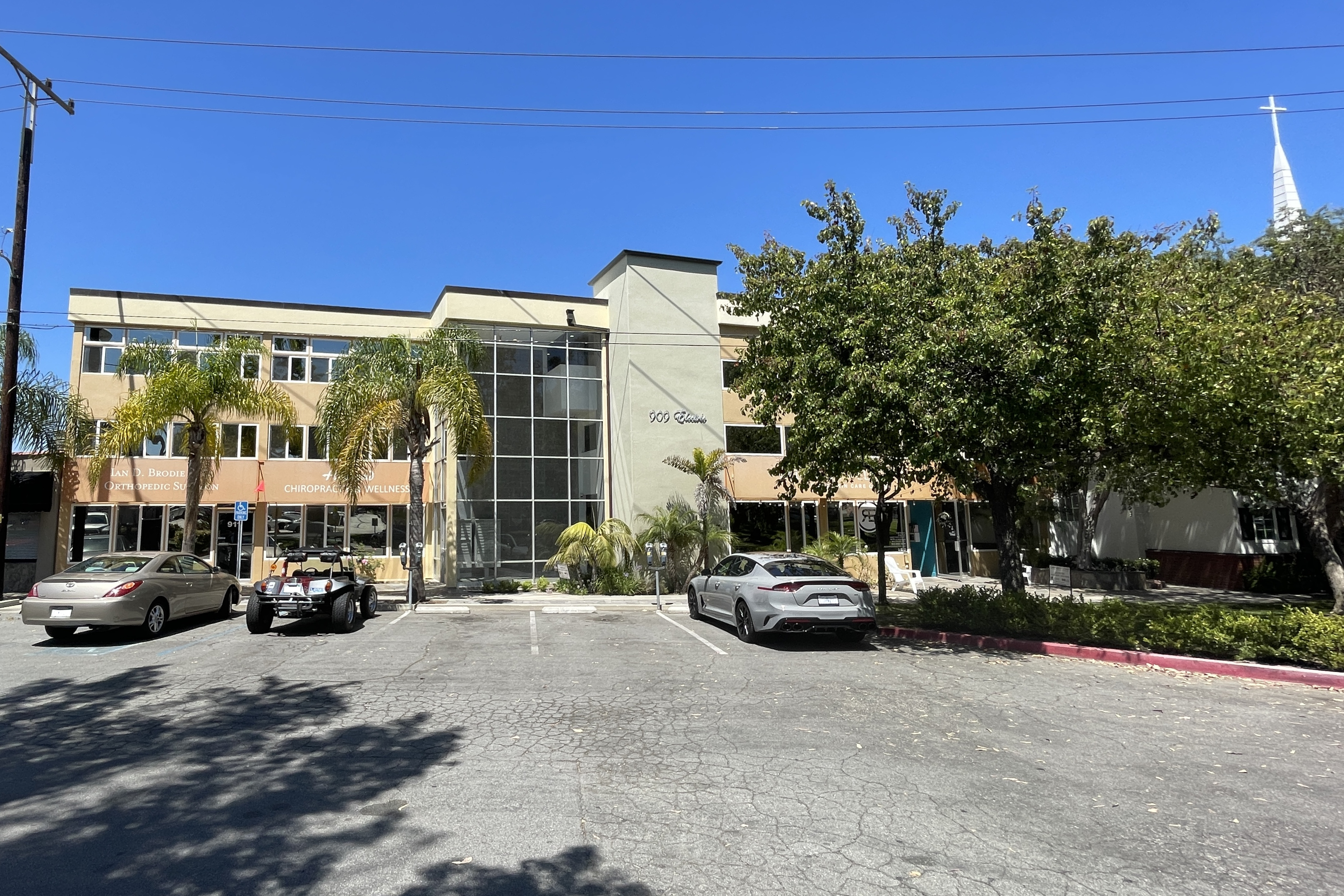
Former headquarters in Seal Beach, California, pictured in 2022

TouchStone Software Corporation, Inc., founded in 1982, is an American software developer for the personal computer (PC) industry, specializing in system update technology. It also owns and operates a network of Internet Web properties. Based in Marco Island, Florida, the company was a subsidiary of Phoenix Technologies until 2010 when it was acquired by the former management team who had sold the company to Phoenix Technologies in 2008.

The company's portfolio of Internet properties serves as the main outlet to deliver its software products, such as RegistryWizard, DriverAgent and BIOS Agent.

== Products ==
- PC Works / Unihost / Macline - communications programs that allow computers to link with IBM PC's using modems
- Checklt & WinChecklt - Diagnostic Kit
- PC-cillin - Antivirus
- e.support
- e.checkit
- UndeletePlus
- Registry Wizard
- Software Updater
- NTFS Undelete
