= UEFITool =

Software program

- Original author(s): Nikolaj Schlej
- Stable release: A62 / 2022 October 03; 2 years ago
- Repository: github.com/LongSoft/UEFITool
- Written in: C++
- Operating system: Windows, macOS, Linux
- License: BSD-2-Clause license
- Website: github.com/LongSoft/UEFITool/wiki

UEFITool is a software program for reading and modifying EEPROM images with UEFI firmware. It is written in C++ using the Qt library. Features include the ability to view the flash regions and to extract and import them. UEFITool allows the user to search for hex and text patterns.

UEFITool presents UEFI firmware images in a tree-like structure. It highlights the modules which are protected by the Intel Boot Guard.
