= Phoenix Technologies =

American software company

Coordinates: 34°08′36.3″N 118°08′27.4″W

Phoenix Technologies Ltd.
- Type: Privately held
- Industry: Software
- Founded: 1979; 47 years ago
- Headquarters: Campbell, California, U.S.
- Key people: Gerard Moore (president and CEO)
- Products: System firmware: SecureCore, OmniCore, ServerCore; BMC firmware: ServerBMC; Consumer products: SecureWipe, PassKey
- Revenue: ▼$67.7 Million USD (2009)
- Number of employees: 200+
- Website: phoenixtech.com

Phoenix Technologies Ltd. is an American software company that designed, developed, and supports core system software for personal computers and other computing devices. The company's products – commonly referred to as BIOS (Basic Input/Output System) or firmware – support and enable the compatibility, connectivity, security and management of the various components and technologies used in such devices. Phoenix Technologies and IBM developed the El Torito standard.

Phoenix was incorporated in Massachusetts in September 1979, and its headquarters are in Campbell, California.

On April 27, 2026, Phoenix sold its firmware (BIOS) technology business to Lenovo, but will continue to contract with and support its other firmware customers with no change.

== History ==
In 1979, Neil Colvin formed what was then called Phoenix Software Associates after his prior employer, Xitan, went out of business. Neil hired Dave Hirschman, a former Xitan employee. During 1980–1981, they rented office space for the first official Phoenix location at 151 Franklin Street, Boston, Massachusetts.

In this same time period Phoenix purchased a non-exclusive license for Seattle Computer Products 86-DOS. Phoenix developed customized versions of 86-DOS (or sometimes called PDOS for Phoenix DOS) for various microprocessor platforms. Phoenix also provided PMate as a replacement for Edlin as the DOS file editor. Phoenix also developed C language libraries, called PForCe, along with Plink-86/Plink-86plus, overlay linkers, and Pfix-86, a windowed Debugger for DOS. These products only provided a small revenue stream to Phoenix during the early 1980s and the company did not significantly expand in size.

=== Cloning the IBM PC BIOS ===
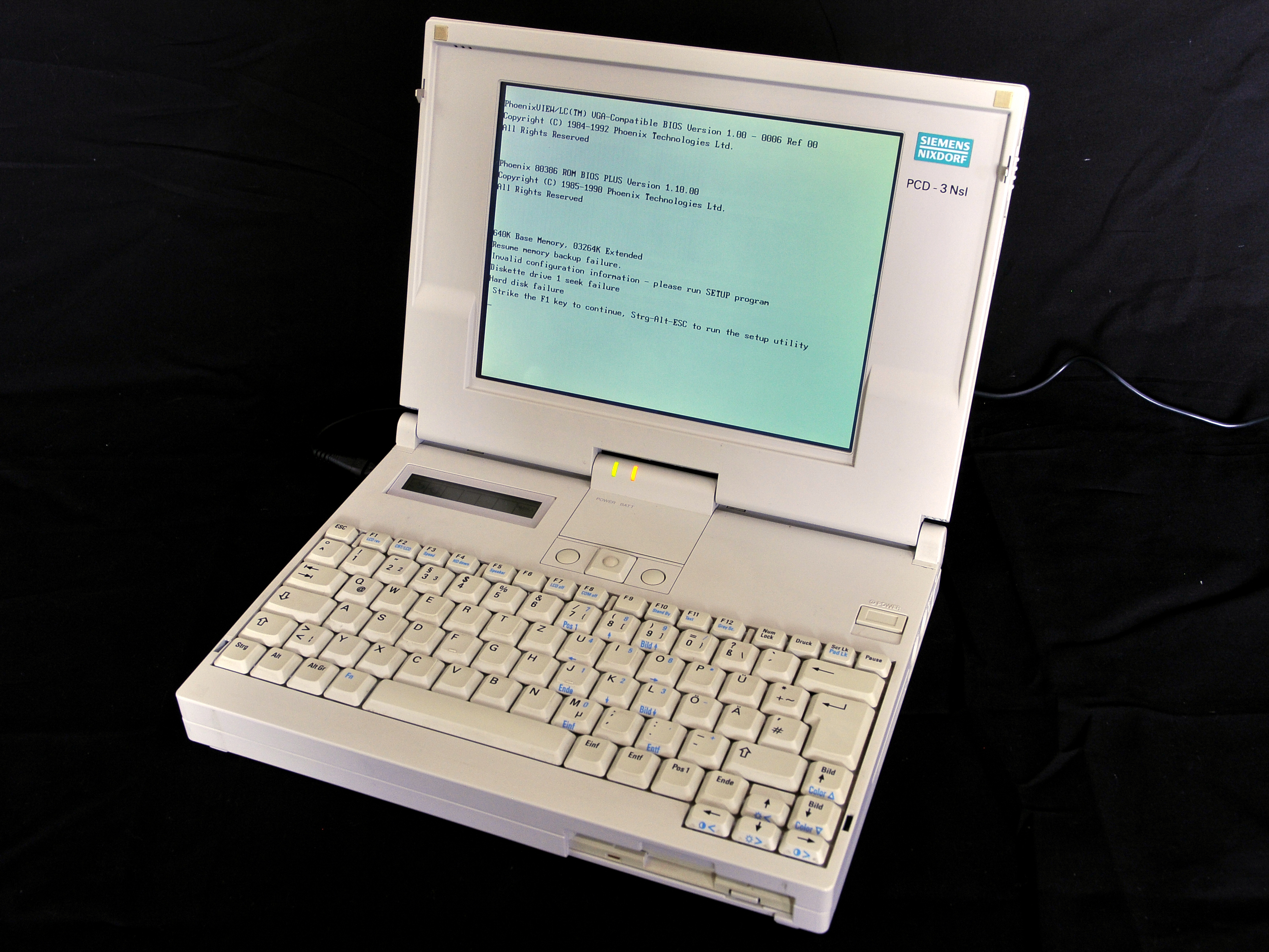
Siemens Nixdorf laptop from 1992 using Phoenix 80386 ROM BIOS PLUS Version 1.10.00

After the success of the IBM PC, many companies began making PC clones. Some, like Compaq, developed their own compatible ROM BIOS, but others violated copyright by directly copying the PC's BIOS from the IBM PC Technical Reference Manual (appendix of the manual incorporated assembly code listings). After Apple Computer, Inc. v. Franklin Computer Corp. IBM sued companies that it claimed infringed IBM's copyright. Clone manufacturers needed a legal, fully-compatible BIOS.

To develop a legal BIOS, Phoenix used a clean room design. Engineers read the BIOS source listings in the IBM PC Technical Reference Manual. They wrote technical specifications for the BIOS APIs for a single, separate engineer—one with experience programming the Texas Instruments TMS9900, not the Intel 8088 or 8086—who had not been exposed to IBM BIOS source code. The single engineer developed code to mimic the BIOS APIs. By recording the audit trail of the two groups' interactions, Phoenix developed a defensibly non-infringing IBM PC compatible ROM BIOS. Because the programmers who wrote the Phoenix code never read IBM's reference manuals, nothing they wrote could have been copied from IBM's code, no matter how closely the two matched. This reverse engineering technique is commonly referred to as a "Chinese wall". This story was portrayed in the TV show Halt and Catch Fire.

The first Phoenix PC ROM BIOS was introduced in May 1984, which enabled OEMs such as Hewlett-Packard, Tandy Corporation, and AT&T Computer Systems to build essentially 100%-compatible clones without having to reverse-engineer the PC BIOS themselves as Compaq had.

Phoenix licensed the BIOS to clone makers for $290,000. To reassure customers, the company obtained a $2 million insurance policy from The Hartford against copyright-infringement lawsuits. Phoenix's revenues grew by 100% in 1987, and the company shifted to licensing the BIOS on a per-machine basis instead of a flat fee. Competitors appeared, such as AMI BIOS. Phoenix shipped an IBM PC/AT-compatible BIOS six months after the computer's announcement, and also developed IBM PS/2 Micro Channel-compatible BIOS, including the ABIOS, and EISA compatible BIOS during 1988 and 1989.

=== 1987–1989 ===
In 1987, Phoenix began the first of many expansion, acquisition, and collapse cycles. It acquired Softstyle, Inc, and Softset, Inc, and began a printer emulation product line, and a Phoenix publishing division. Phoenix also tripled the number of employees from late 1986 to 1989.

Phoenix launched an IPO in June 1988 and made the founder and early employees instant millionaires on paper. The stock price did not sustain its peak of 18¾, and by late 1989 it had plummeted to 3¾. In addition, the company posted a loss of $7.7 million in 1989, due primarily to the consolidation of the PC market, and Phoenix's unsuccessful branching out into collateral markets. In December 1989, Ron Fisher took over as CEO, by which time the company had ended its attempt to create a Unix-compatible market. Sales of its PostScript-compatible Phoenix Page Control System reportedly disappointed the company, as did its VP/ix DOS emulator for Unix. Attempts to compete in Asia against Award BIOS had also reportedly failed. Phoenix focused on the core PC BIOS products, and prevented a hostile takeover bid by Norwood Partners Limited Partnership.

=== 1990s ===
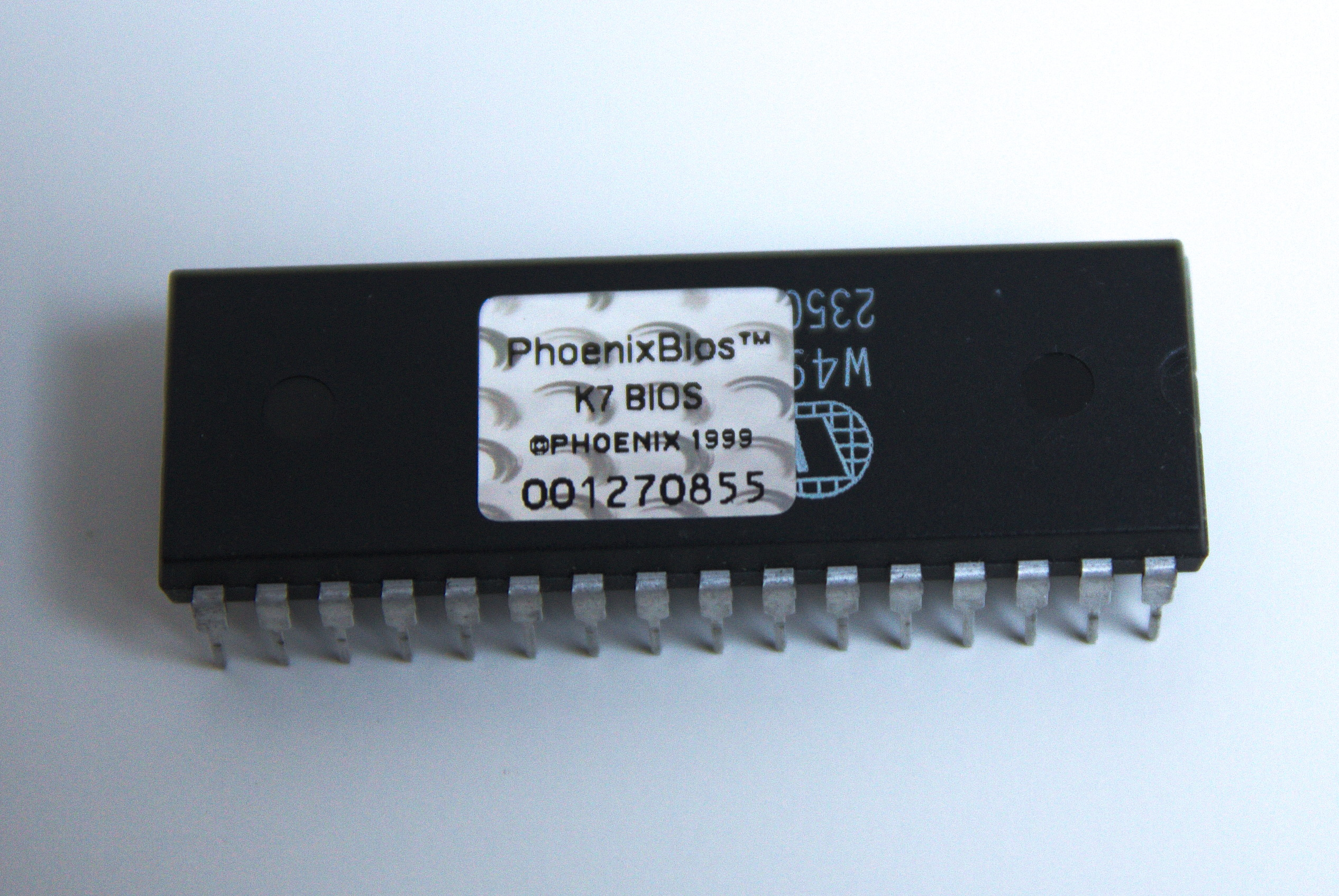
Phoenix Bios, 1999

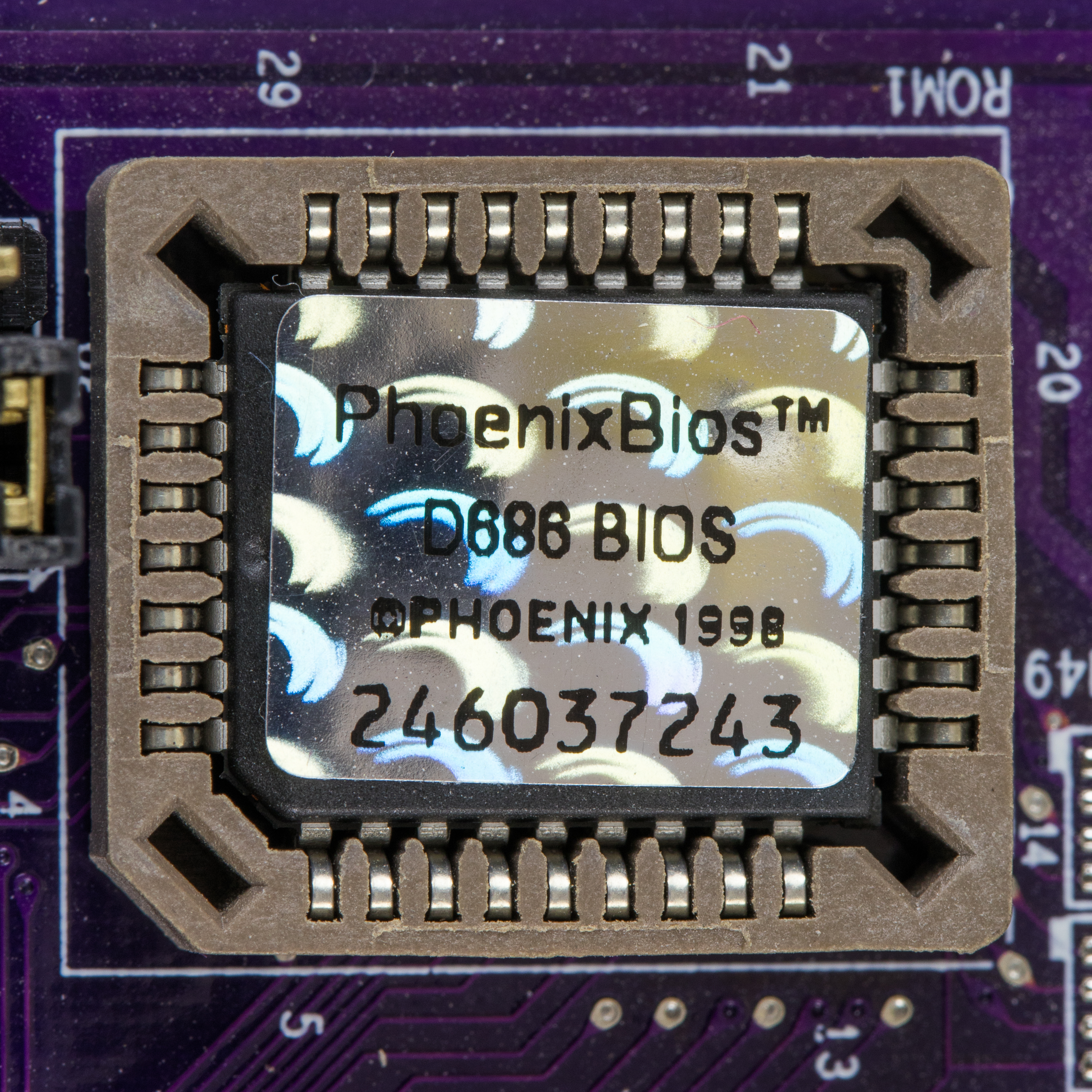
Phoenix Bios, 1998 (PLCC package)

By 1992, Phoenix was financially healthy enough to start another expansion and acquisition cycle. In January 1992, Phoenix acquired Quadtel, a leading BIOS supplier. The Quadtel BIOS code base was newer than the original Phoenix ROM BIOS code base, and the development effort switched to the Quadtel products. It was rebranded as PhoenixBIOS. The original ROM BIOS code base was used on a joint development effort with David Keenan at IBM (called SurePath), but Phoenix did no further development work on the original code.

Phoenix also expanded its presence in foreign markets. In 1993 Phoenix acquired SRI KK, a Phoenix distributor, and formed the Phoenix KK Japanese subsidiary. In addition, the offices in Taipei, and Europe were expanded in size. In 1994, Phoenix acquired Guildford, Surrey, UK-based DIP Research Ltd. and continued to expand European operations, who had previously developed the DIP DOS operating system for the DIP Pocket PC aka Atari Portfolio in 1989. In 1996, Phoenix acquired Virtual Chips, Inc., a maker of synthesizable cores for PC peripherals, and Mountain View, California-based Award Software in 1998. Due to these expansions, Phoenix reduced its global work force by 5% by ending 38 jobs.

=== 2001–2003 ===
Phoenix continued to grow steadily from the late 1990s, and saw a significant increase in revenues from the Y2K product refreshes in the PC industry. However, by mid-2001, the PC industry suffered another downturn, and Phoenix was forced to reduce the less profitable product lines, such as the IA-64 effort, and close a number of redundant offices. Phoenix again focused on the core BIOS business for the next few years.

During late 2002 and 2003, Phoenix began to develop specialized firmware-based applications. These applications often had components embedded in the BIOS that allowed them to function in damaged PC systems. These included security applications for password hiding and authentication, PC backup and recovery applications, and basic diagnostic applications. Several applications were obtained through complete acquisitions of other companies, such as the SPEKE technology from Integrity Sciences, or the browser technology from Ravisent.

The PC BIOS business continued its steady, but slow, growth despite a rapidly declining unit price. The Award product line was focused on the low-margin, high volume Desktop product line, while the Phoenix TrustedCore BIOS was primarily successful in the high-end PC systems, and Servers. The revenues from the BIOS business continued to provide the capital to invest further in the applications business.

Entering 2000s, Phoenix refused UEFI and insist on Legacy BIOS, make it difficult to compete with AMI and make its market share decreased.

=== 2005–2008 ===
By late 2005, it became clear that the BIOS revenues could not sustain the losses incurred by the applications business. The BIOS revenue stream was heavily leveraged through fully paid-up licenses, and by early 2006 this business model was no longer sustainable. Phoenix announced some of the largest losses in the company history, and went through another consolidation cycle. Several offices were closed and over 70% of the employees were laid off. By late 2006, after senior management changes, the company refocused on the PC BIOS business and the couple of potentially profitable applications.

In September, the company named Woodson "Woody" Hobbs as president and CEO of Phoenix Technologies. Hobbs had a history of turning struggling companies around. According to company documents, "prior to joining Phoenix, Hobbs served as president and CEO of Intellisync Corporation from 2002 until the company's acquisition by Nokia in February 2006. Under Hobbs' leadership, Intellisync became the number two wireless email company, increased its stock price by nearly ten times, and grew enterprise value from zero to over $430 million."

By January 2008, Phoenix had posted higher-than-expected Q1 revenues and increased full year guidance.

In 2008, Phoenix also acquired several companies:

- In May, Phoenix acquired BeInSync, Ltd., an Israeli-based provider of an all-in-one solution that allows users to back up, synchronize, share and access data online. Although Phoenix did not disclose the amount of the transaction, according to at least one online report, Phoenix acquired BeInSync for $25 million.
- In July, in an effort to develop a strong online presence and infrastructure for web-based automated service delivery, Phoenix acquired TouchStone Software Corporation for its online PC diagnostics and software update technology, eSupport.com this included the recently purchased HijackPro and Drivermagic software from Glenn Bluff. The net value of the transaction was approximately $17 million.
- In September, Phoenix acquired General Software of Bellevue, WA, to extend its firmware leadership to a wide array of specialized high-value, high-margin devices that use embedded processors (embedded systems), from mobile and consumer electronics to data communications.

=== 2009–Present ===
In 2009, Phoenix shut down their Engineering and Sales offices in Shanghai and Nanjing, China. Phoenix also laid off most of the staff in those offices, although some of the managers were moved to other offices in Taiwan. Phoenix opened a new office in Bangalore, India and closed its office in Hyderabad, India. Most of the Hyderabad employees were given the option to move to the new Bangalore office.

In late Q4 2009, Phoenix began exploring strategic alternatives for the products it had developed and purchased in its prior acquisition phase. On January 5, 2010, Phoenix announced it had hired GrowthPoint Technology partners to find alternative business strategies for the FailSafe, HyperSpace and eSupport.com products and would aim to refocus its business strategy on BIOS where it still retained a substantial majority of its revenue.

On April 9, 2010 it was announced that Absolute Software would pay $6.9 million for Phoenix Technologies security technologies, including FailSafe and Freeze.

In August 2010, Marlin Equity Partners, a Los Angeles-based private investment firm, acquired the outstanding shares of Phoenix Technologies for $139 million.

Since 2010, Phoenix Technologies continues to offers UEFI firmware to OEMs, such as Lenovo ThinkPad.

On April 27, 2026, Phoenix sold its firmware (BIOS) technology business to Lenovo, but will continue to contract with and support its other firmware customers with no change. Phoenix Technology will also continue to develop and sell FirmGuard, a remote firmware management package.

== See also ==
- American Megatrends
- Insyde Software
- Tim Paterson
