= DIG64 =

Developers' Interface Guide for 64-bit Intel Architecture Servers
- Company type: Collaborative trade organization
- Industry: Firmware, OSs, Hardware, Application
- Founded: 1999
- Headquarters: USA
- Products: Specifications
- Website: DIG64

DIG64 or Developers' Interface Guide for 64-bit Intel Architecture Servers was an alliance between several leading technology companies including Groupe Bull, Fujitsu Siemens, Hitachi, HP, Intel, NEC, and Unisys.

The corporation had responsibility for driving for interoperability on Itanium platforms. To do this they supported a specification, also called DIG64, that helped member companies develop better and more compelling products on Itanium processor family architecture systems.
