= Insyde Software =

Chinese computer technology company

Insyde Software 系微公司
- Type: Public
- Traded as: TPEx: 6231
- Industry: Computer industry
- Founded: September 18, 1998; 28 years ago
- Founders: Jeremy Wang, Jonathan Joseph
- Headquarters: Taipei, Taiwan
- Products: BIOS/UEFI firmware; EC firmware; BMC firmware; InsydeH2O; Supervyse; BlinkBoot
- Revenue: NT$959,482,000
- Website: www.insyde.com

Insyde Software (Chinese: 系微公司; pinyin: Xìwēi Gōngsī) is a company that specializes in UEFI system firmware and engineering support services, primarily for OEM and ODM computer and component device manufacturers. They are listed on the Gre Tai Market of Taiwan and headquartered in Taipei, with offices in Westborough, Massachusetts, and Portland, Oregon.

== Overview ==
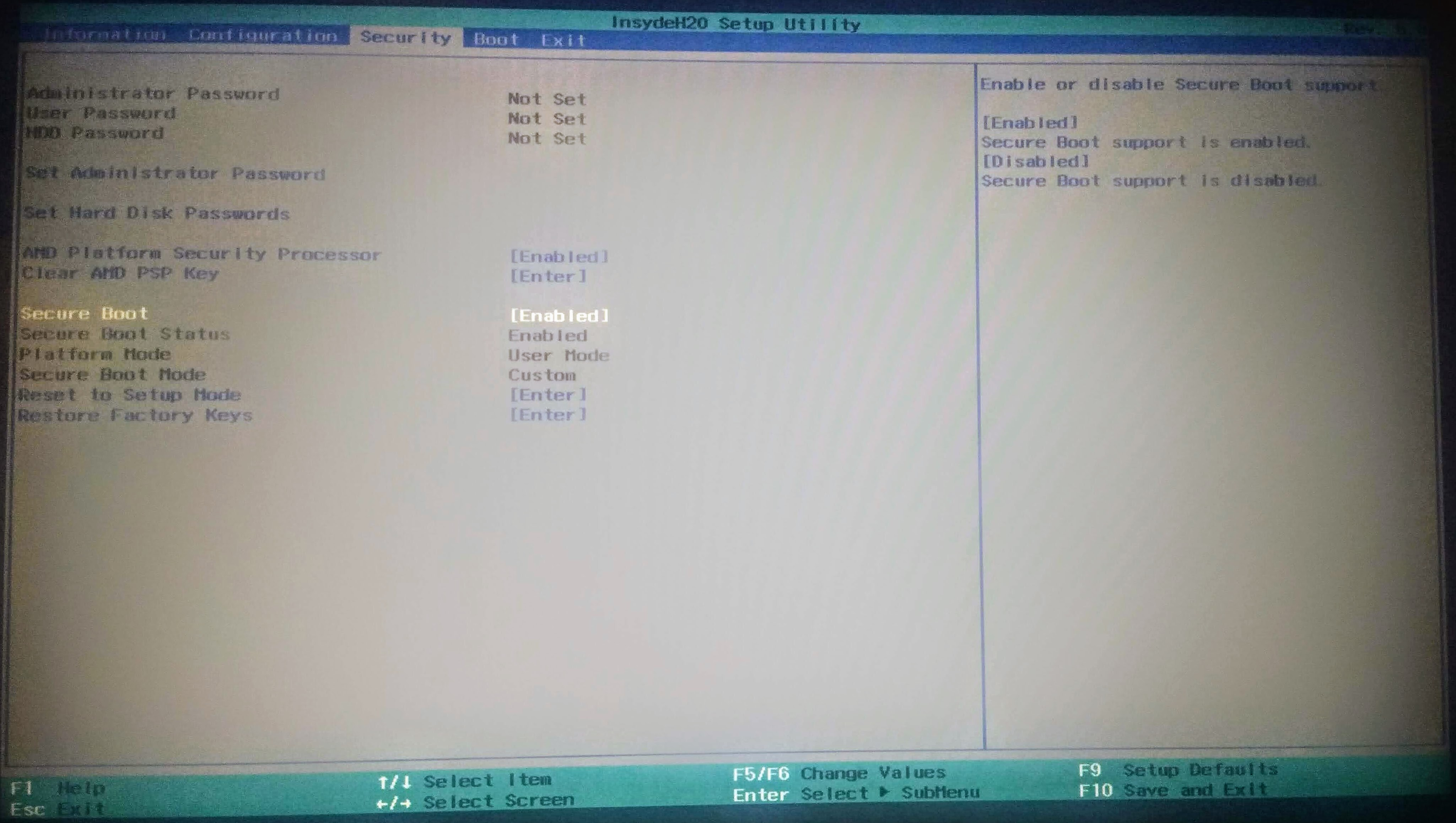
An InsydeH20 screen

The company's product portfolio includes InsydeH2O BIOS (Insyde Software's implementation of the Intel Platform Innovation Framework for UEFI/EFI), BlinkBoot, a UEFI-based boot loader for enabling Internet of Things devices, and Supervyse, which is a full-featured systems management/BMC firmware for providing out-of-band remote management for server computers.

Insyde Software was formed when it purchased the BIOS assets of SystemSoft Corporation (NASDAQ:SYSF) in October, 1998. Initially Insyde Software was a company that included investments from Intel Pacific Inc., China Development Industrial Bank, Professional Computer Technology Limited (PCT), company management and selected employees. At that time, Insyde Software's management team consisted of Jeremy Wang, Chairman (also the Chairman of PCT); Jonathan Joseph, President (a former founder of SystemSoft); Hansen Liou, the General Manager of Taiwan Operations and Asia-Pacific Sales, and Stephen Gentile, the Vice President of Marketing.

Shortly after the initial investment, the company was introduced by Intel to a new BIOS coding architecture called EFI (now UEFI) and the two companies began working together on it. In 2001, the two companies entered into a joint development agreement and Insyde's first shipment of the technology occurred in October 2003 as InsydeH2O UEFI BIOS. Since that time, UEFI has become the mainstay of Insyde's business.

On 23 January 2003, Insyde Software announced its initial public offering on the GreTai Securities Market (GTSM) based in Taipei, Taiwan.

== Products ==
=== InsydeH2O UEFI BIOS ===
The product is a proprietary licensed UEFI BIOS firmware that supports Intel and AMD. PC manufacturers buy the BIOS source code and modify the source code to meet their specific BIOS needs. For the firmware's security vulnerabilities, the company publishes the security advisory, and provides the updates on the CVE fixes and patches to their customers. InsydeH2O is usually used by the PC and server type devices.

In December 2023, Binarly (a security firm) published a set of vulnerabilities discovered on a number of UEFI implementations which they termed "LogoFAIL", including Insyde's. The firm highlighted that malicious actors can bypass boot security protocols using the mentioned set.

== See also ==
- List of companies of Taiwan
- BIOS features comparison
