= Fixed-block architecture =

IBM term for a type of hard disk drive

Fixed-block architecture (FBA) is an IBM term for the hard disk drive (HDD) layout in which each addressable block (more commonly, sector) on the disk has the same size, utilizing 4 byte block numbers and a new set of command codes. FBA as a term was created and used by IBM for its 3310 and 3370 HDDs beginning in 1979 to distinguish such drives as IBM transitioned away from their variable record size format used on IBM's mainframe hard disk drives beginning in 1964 with its System/360.

== Overview ==
From RAMAC until the early 1960s most hard disk drive data were addressed in the form of a three number block addressing scheme Cylinder, Head & Sector (CHS); the cylinder number, which positioned the head access mechanism; the head number, which selected the read-write head; and the sector number, which specified the rotational position of a fixed size block. On June 2, 1961, IBM introduced the 1301, which had variable length records, and the market for sector-oriented disks was eclipsed for decades.

IBM's 1964 System/360 introduced their new self-formatting variable-length record format for disk and other random-access drives, wherein each record had an optional variable length key field and a variable length data field. IBM mainframe disk, drum and mass storage devices, called direct access storage devices (DASD) are addressed using a six byte seek address for seek commands and a five byte CCHHR for search count commands. OS/360 and other S/360 operating systems used an 8-byte address structured as MBBCCHHR (Extent (M) (Note: The extent can be 0x00 through 0xff, with up to 16 extents for each dataset in a concatenation (association) of up to 16 logically separate devices, even of different device types, although each device allocation may have only 16 such extents.)-Bin (BB) (Note: Applies only to 2321 Data Cell devices, and is 0x00 otherwise.)-Cylinder (CC)-Head (HH)-Record (R), which was capable of storing records of varying size, up to 255 such records per track, with the zeroth record (R0) being reserved for certain error correction information, such as skip defects). In addition to data, records could also contain a key. The length of the key, like the length of the data, was specified by the application writing the record. In addition to addressing records by number, it was possible to search disks by key, using the underlying count key data (CKD) structure.

The term fixed-block architecture was created by IBM in 1979 to distinguish this format from its variable-length record format. Each track is divided into fixed-length blocks, consisting of an ID field and a data field. Application programs refer to blocks by relative block number, and cannot address them by cylinder, head and record. Although the FBA commands allowed a query to determine the data area size, (Note: Not counting ECC) the 3310 and 3370 have the same size data fields, 512 bytes. Fixed-block architecture was adopted for a few mainframe HDDs produced by IBM beginning in the 1970s, and contemporary DASD systems continue to support 3310 and 3370 compatibility. MVS continues to require CKD DASD, although by the 1990s all new IBM HDDs used fixed sectors internally.

IBM's various sectored disks had block sizes of 100 or 200 characters, and 270, 366, 512, 1024, 2048, or 4096 bytes.

Blocks are typically separated on the track by inter-record gaps. Together, the block size and the size of the inter-record gap determine how many blocks can fit in each track.

== Later formats ==
A later development in disk addressing was logical block addressing (LBA), in which the cylinder-head-sector triplet was replaced by a single number, called the block number. Within the disk drive, this linear block number was translated into a cylinder number, head number and sector number. Moving the translation into the disk drive allowed drive manufacturers to place a different number of blocks on each track transparently to the accessing software.

Still later, magnetic hard disks employed an evolution of LBA where the size of the addressable disk sectors can differ from the physical block size. For example, Advanced Format (AF) 512e HDDs use 4096-byte physical sectors, while their firmware provides emulation for a virtual sector size of 512 bytes; thus, "512e" stands for "512-byte emulation".

== See also ==
- Block (data storage)
- Data set (IBM mainframe)
- Count key data (CKD)
- Record (computer science)
- Track (disk drive)
- Volume Table of Contents (VTOC)
