= Address space =

Computing concept

In computing, an address space defines a range of discrete addresses, each of which may correspond to a network host, a peripheral device, a disk sector, a physical memory location, a virtual memory location, or another logical or physical entity.

Address spaces are created by combining enough uniquely identified qualifiers to make an address unambiguous within the address space. For a person's physical address, the address space would be a combination of locations, such as a neighborhood, town, city, or country. Some elements of a data address space may be the same, but if any element in the address is different, addresses in said space will reference different entities. For example, there could be multiple buildings at the same address of "32 Main Street" but in different towns, demonstrating that different towns have different, although similarly arranged, street address spaces.

An address space usually provides (or allows) a partitioning to several regions according to the mathematical structure it has. In the case of total order, as for memory addresses, these are simply chunks. Like the hierarchical design of postal addresses, some nested domain hierarchies appear as a directed ordered tree, such as with the Domain Name System or a directory structure. In the Internet, the Internet Assigned Numbers Authority (IANA) allocates ranges of IP addresses to various registries so each can manage their parts of the global Internet address space.

== Examples ==
Uses of addresses include, but are not limited to the following:

- Memory addresses for main memory, memory-mapped I/O, as well as for virtual memory;
- Device addresses on an expansion bus;
- Sector addressing for disk drives;
- Various kinds of network host addresses in computer networks;
- Uniform resource locators in the Internet.

== Address mapping and translation ==
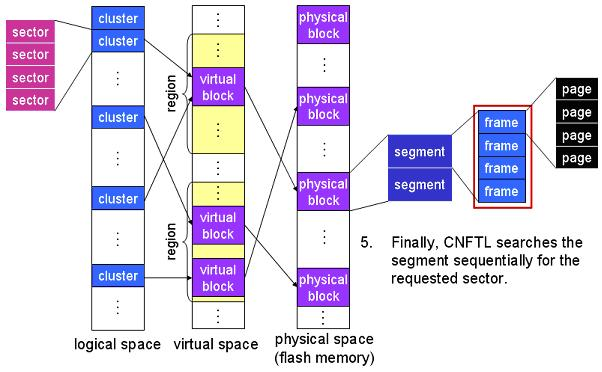
Illustration of translation from logical block addressing to physical geometry

Another common feature of address spaces are mappings and translations, often forming numerous layers. This usually means that some higher-level address must be translated to lower-level ones in some way. For example, a file system on a logical disk operates using linear sector numbers, which have to be translated to absolute LBA sector addresses, in simple cases, via addition of the partition's first sector address. Then, for a disk drive connected via Parallel ATA, each of them must be converted to logical cylinder-head-sector address due to the interface historical shortcomings. It is converted back to LBA by the disk controller, then, finally, to physical cylinder, head and sector numbers.

The Domain Name System maps its names to and from network-specific addresses (usually IP addresses), which in turn may be mapped to link layer network addresses via Address Resolution Protocol. Network address translation may also occur on the edge of different IP spaces, such as a local area network and the Internet.

Virtual address space and physical address space relationship

An iconic example of virtual-to-physical address translation is virtual memory, where different pages of virtual address space map either to page file or to main memory physical address space. It is possible that several numerically different virtual addresses all refer to one physical address and hence to the same physical byte of RAM. It is also possible that a single virtual address maps to one, one, or more than one physical address.

== See also ==
- Addressability
- Flat memory model
- Namespace
- Virtualization
