= Leaf driver =

Leaf driver refers to a device driver that accesses logically or physically existent devices on an I/O bus, and implements the functions defined for the device, such as transferring data to or from the device or accessing device registers.

In some systems, for example Solaris, drivers are organized into a tree structure. A driver that provides services to other drivers below it in the tree is called, in Solaris terminology, a bus nexus driver. A tree node with no children, a leaf node, is called a leaf driver.

Leaf devices (those requiring leaf drivers) are typical peripheral devices such as disks, tapes, network adapters, Framebuffer, and so forth. Drivers for these devices export the traditional character and block driver interfaces for use by user processes to read and write data to storage or communication devices.

== See also ==
- Nexus driver
