= Index mark =

Index mark has multiple meanings.

In computing, an index mark or index track is a physical impression made on a hard disk drive. Its purpose is to indicate the starting point for each track on the hard disk drive. Usually, an index mark takes the form of a hole, gap, or magnetic strip. It also allows a hard disk drive head to quickly move to various spots on the drive.

In electronics components, an index mark is a reference symbol printed on or molded into the casing of a device or circuit board, to indicate the location of "Pin 1". This allows the correct orientation of the component in a larger circuit assembly, so that the electrical leads can be correctly connected.

Another kind of index mark is a component of the registration system for road vehicles in the United Kingdom. It consists of a two-letter combination allocated to a local vehicle licensing office. Certain letters are associated with particular parts of the British Isles. Marks that include I or Z are issued either in the Republic of Ireland or Northern Ireland, those that include S in Scotland, and others in England and Wales, though some combinations have not been authorised for use. As an example the combinations AF, CV, GL, and RL were allocated to the Truro licensing office.
