= Cluster straddling =

Cluster straddling may refer to:

- Cluster straddling (data storage), a performance and wear leveling problem in computer data storage (f.e. with Advanced format hard disks, or in file systems)
- Cluster straddling (particle systems), a problem in physics (center of mass, cluster analysis)
