= Nexus driver =

Type of bus device driver

A Nexus driver is a bus device driver that interfaces leaf drivers to a specific I/O bus and provides the low-level integration of this I/O bus.

In some systems, for example Solaris, drivers are organized into a tree structure. A driver that provides services to other drivers below it in the tree is called, in Solaris terminology, a nexus driver. A tree node with no children, a leaf node, is called a leaf driver.
