= Sector slipping =

Sector slipping is a technique used to deal with defective sectors in hard disk drives. Due to the volatility of hard disks from their moving parts and low tolerances, some sectors become defective. Defective sectors can even come on hard disks from the factory, so most disks incorporate a bad-block recovery system to help cope with these issues.

== Description ==
During a low-level format, defect lists are populated, which store a list of bad sectors, which are then mapped and a sector slipping algorithm is utilized. When using sector slipping for bad sectors, disk access time is not largely affected. The drive will skip over a bad sector using the time it would have used to read it. Spare sectors are located on the disk to aid in having sectors to “slip” other sectors down to, allowing for the preservation of sequential ordering of the data. Accuracy of programs, reliant on static knowledge of cylinders and block positions will be compromised, however.

Bad sectors that are found during normal usage of the disk are not capable of having the sector slipping algorithm applied. Instead, a linear reallocation, or sector forwarding, is used where a bad sector is replaced with a sector from a spare area. Doing this affects the access times, as the disk will need to seek to the spare sector since all further lookups of the bad sector will redirect to the new sector.

== Example ==
Logical Sectors         Physical Sectors
Pre Low-Level Format

        0                     0                        
        1                     1               
        2                     2                  
        3                     3               
        4                     4                          
        5                     5                                          
                              6  
                              7

Logical Sectors         Physical Sectors
Post Low-Level Format

        0       ------->      0
        1       ------->      1
        2       ------->      2
                              3 (Bad)
        3       ------->      4
                              5 (Bad)
        4       ------->      6
        5       ------->      7   

In this example, physical sectors 3 and 5 were found to be bad. The sectors were then slipped down to allow for the logical sectors to be placed in sequential order on good sectors. Sector 3 was slipped down to 4 and sector 4 was slipped down to 6. The rest of the sectors were slipped down to the remaining spare sectors: Sector 4 to 6 and sector 5 to 7.
