= Zone bit recording =

Disk drive optimization method

In computer storage, zone bit recording (ZBR) is a method used by disk drives to optimise the tracks for increased data capacity. It does this by placing more sectors per zone on outer tracks than inner tracks, which can be achieved by varying the rotational rate (constant linear velocity), the data rate (with constant angular velocity) or a combination of both (using zoned constant angular velocity). On a disk consisting of roughly concentric tracks, whether realized as separate circular tracks or as a single spiral track, the physical track length (circumference) is increased as it gets further from the centre hub.

Physical layout of sectors in a zone-bit disc: As distance from the centre increases, the number of sectors in a given angle increases from one (red) to two (green) to four (grey).

The inner tracks are packed as densely as the particular drive's technology allows. The packing of the rest of the disks is changed depending on the type of disk. Zone recording was pioneered and patented by Chuck Peddle in 1961 while working for General Electric.

With a CAV-drive the data on the outer tracks are the same angular width of those in the centre, and so less densely packed. Using ZBR instead, the inner zoning is used to set the read/write rate, which is the same for other tracks. This permits the drive to have more bits stored in the outside tracks compared to the inner ones. Storing more bits per track equates to achieving a higher total data capacity on the same disk area.

However, ZBR influences other performance characteristics of the hard disk. In the outermost tracks, data will have the highest data transfer rate. Since both hard disks and floppy disks typically number their tracks beginning at the outer edge and continuing inward, and because operating systems usually fill the lowest-numbered tracks first, this is where the operating system normally stores its own files during its initial installation onto an empty drive. Testing disk drives when they are new or empty after defragmenting them with some benchmarking applications will often show their highest performance. After some time, when more data is stored in the inner tracks, the average data transfer rate will drop, because the transfer rate in the inner zones is slower; this, combined with the head's longer stroke and possible fragmentation, may give the impression of the disk drive slowing down over time.

Some other ZBR drives, such as the 800 kilobyte 3.5" floppy drives in the Apple IIGS and older Macintosh computers, do not change the data rate, but rather spin the medium slower when reading or writing outer tracks, thus approximating the performance of constant linear velocity drives.

== Products that use ZBR ==
- Commodore 1541 floppy disk (combined ZBR, ZCAV and GCR for 17–21 sectors á 256 bytes in 4 writing speed zones)
- Sirius 1/Victor 9000 floppy disk (combined ZBR, ZCLV and GCR for 11–19 sectors á 512 bytes in 9 rotation speed zones)
- Apple Macintosh 400K/800K floppy disk (combined ZBR, ZCAV and GCR)
- DVD-RAM
- Most hard drives since the 1990s

== See also ==
- Zoned constant linear velocity (ZCLV)
- Constant linear velocity (CLV)
