= Volume Table of Contents =

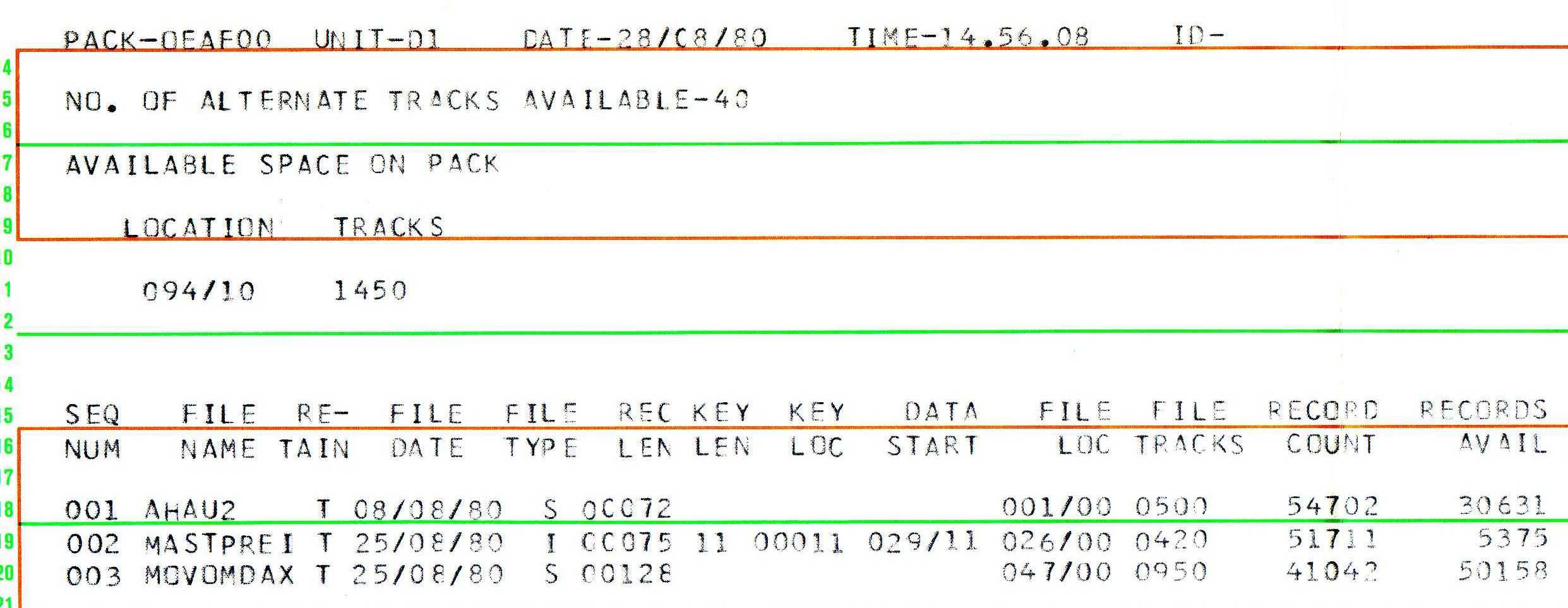
VTOC 28 August 1980

In the storage architecture of OS/360 and successors, CMS, and DOS/360 and successors, the Volume Table of Contents (VTOC) is a data structure that provides a way of locating the data sets that reside on a particular DASD volume. With the exception of the IBM Z compatible disk layout (Note: The VTOC for an IBM Z compatible minidisk has a VTOC with up to three datasets, each containing a Linux File system.) in Linux on Z, it is the functional equivalent of the MS/PC DOS File Allocation Table (FAT), the NTFS Master File Table (MFT), and an inode table in a file system for a Unix-like system. (Note: While the VTOC only needs to associate names directly with storage allocations, a Unix file system has an indirect association via inodes.) The VTOC is not used to contain any IPLTEXT (Note: However, the IPL text on cylinder 0 track 0 does read and use the VTOC.) and does not have any role (Note: Although the code in IPLTEXT for some systems searches the VTOC of the IPL volume.) in the IPL process, therefore does not have any data used by or functionally equivalent to the MBR. It lists the names of each data set on the volume as well as size, location, and permissions. Additionally, it contains an entry for every area of contiguous free space on the volume. The third record on the first track of the first cylinder of any DASD (e.g., disk) volume is known as the volume label and must contain a pointer to the location of the VTOC. The location of the VTOC may be specified when the volume is initialized. For performance reasons it may be located as close to the center of the volume as possible, since it is referenced frequently. A VTOC is added to a DASD volume when it is initialized using the Device Support Facilities (Note: DSF replaces the original IBCDASD and IEHDASDR, which IBM no longer distributes and which can not run on current hardware.) program, ICKDSF, in current systems.

When a job in OS/360 and successors allocates a data set, it generally searches the catalog to determine the volumes on which it resides. (Note: It is possible, although unusual, for a job to bypass the catalog and specify the volume via dynamic allocation or JCL parameters.) When a program opens a Direct Access Storage Device (DASD) dataset, the OPEN routine searches the VTOC index (VTOCIX) if there is one, or directly searches the VTOC if there is no VTOCIX.

== Data Set Control Block types ==
The VTOC consists of a sequence of 140-byte records known as Data Set Control Blocks (DSCBs). There are ten types of DSCB.

DSCB types in a VTOC
DSCB format type	Purpose	Notes
0	Empty entry	
1	Data set primary	Describes first three extents of a data set (Starting and ending cylinders and tracks)
2	ISAM data set	Describes ISAM data sets
3	Data set extension	Describes data set extents after the third
4	VTOC	Describes volume attributes
5	Free space	26 extents on non-index volumes
6	Shared Cylinder Allocation	In OS/360, Format 6 DSCB is used for Shared Cylinder Allocation, which enabled multiple datasets to be interleaved across a range of cylinders (such that, for example, the first half of each cylinder was allocated for data set A, and the second half for data set B). This was intended as a performance optimisation to reduce head movement when two or more datasets were expected to be used simultaneously. In current releases of z/OS, shared cylinder allocation format 6 DSCB is no longer supported.
7	Free space	Extension of Format 4 DSCB
8	Data set primary	EAV (Note: Extended Address Volume, a volume with more than 65,520 cylinders.) version of Format 1 DSCB
9	Data set extension	EAV extension of Format 3 DSCB

The VTOC must reside within the first 64K tracks on the volume, and The first DSCB in the VTOC is always a format 4 DSCB which describes the VTOC itself (Note: The VTOC has a dataset name as the VTOC is, indeed, a dataset; the VTOC's dataset name is (44) X'04' characters, which, in later instances of the OS, has become a protected name; a program may not write into it without authorization.) and attributes of the DASD volume on which this VTOC resides. The second DSCB is always a format 5 DSCB which describes free space within the VTOC. Normally, the rest of the VTOC will contain format 0 DSCBs, which are empty entries, and format 1 or format 3 DSCBs, which describe the extents of data sets, giving their start address and end address (Note: Each extent is described by a starting CCHH and an ending CCHH, relative to the beginning of the disk, which is CCHH=x'00000000'.) of up to 16 such extents on disk. The initial part of a data set is described by a format 1 DSCB. If necessary, format 3 DSCBs are used to describe further extents of the data set. When a data set is deleted, its format 1 DSCB is overwritten to become a format 0 DSCB, and the format 3 DSCB, if one exists, is similarly deleted.

Originally, a VTOC search was a sequential scan of the DSCBs, stopping when the correct format 1 DSCB was found or the end of the VTOC was reached. As DASD volumes became larger, VTOC search became a bottleneck and so a VTOC index was added.

=== Format 1 DSCB ===
This VTOC entry describes a dataset and defines its first three extents. This is the format of the DSCB from OS/360 Release 21.7 in 1973, prior to changes for Y2K.

Position	Length	Description
0	44	Dataset name, left-adjusted and space-filled this is the DSCB record key.
44	1	Format identifier, '1' for Format-1 DSCB (character)
45	6	Volume serial number of first DASD volume for this dataset (alphanumeric)
51	2	Volume sequence number of this volume for multi-volume datasets (binary)
53	3	Dataset creation date (binary) one byte for year of century (Note: Changed to offset from 1900 in support of Y2K.) and two bytes for day-of-year
56	3	Dataset expiration date (same format as creation date); 99365 indicates that this dataset will never expire.
59	1	Number of extents for this dataset (binary)
60	1	If this dataset is a partitioned dataset this is the number of bytes used in the last directory block. (binary)
61	1	Unused, listed as reserved by IBM.
62	13	Code identifying the operating system that created this dataset. (character)
75	7	Unused, listed as reserved by IBM.
82	2	Code indicating dataset organization (sequential, indexed, etc.) (bitfield)
84	1	Code indicating the record format of this dataset (fixed, variable, etc.) (bitfield)
85	1	Option code, other options specified when the dataset was created (bitfield)
86	2	Block size (fixed size, or maximum size for files of variable-length records) (binary)
88	2	Record length (fixed size or maximum length for variable length records) (binary)
90	1	Key length if this file has recorded record keys. (binary)
91	2	Position of the key (if any) in the record relative to zero. (binary)
93	1	Indicator bits, for example indicating that the dataset is password-protected. (bitfield)
94	4	Dataset allocation parameters, indicating, for example that space for this dataset is to be allocated in blocks, cylinders, etc. (bitfield)
95	3	Secondary allocation quantity: Number of blocks, cylinders, etc. to be allocated if additional space is required. (binary) For example, if the dataset is created with the DD card specification SPACE=(CYL,(4,2)) the dataset is initially allocated four cylinders, and an additional two cylinders, not necessary contiguous, will be allocated each time more space is needed, up to fifteen additional extents.
98	3	DASD address of last block written in the dataset.
101	2	Number of bytes remaining on last track following last block indicated above. (binary)
103	2	Unused, listed as reserved by IBM.
105	10	Description of first or only extent. Type of extent (one byte, bitfield), extent sequence number (one byte, binary), extent starting cylinder and track (four bytes, binary), extent ending cylinder and track (four bytes, binary).
115	10	Description of possible second extent, same format as above.
125	10	Description of possible third extent, same format as above.
135	5	Pointer to Format-2 (index) DSCB in VTOC in format cylinder/head/record if this is indexed dataset. Pointer to Format-3 (extension) DSCB if this dataset has more than three extents.

== See also ==
- Data Control Block (DCB)
- Count Key Data (CKD)
- Master Boot Record (MBR on PCs)
