= Track (disk drive) =

Figure 1. Disk structures: (A) Track (B) Geometrical sector (C) Track sector (D) Cluster

A disk drive track is a circular path on the surface of a disk or diskette on which information is magnetically recorded and from which recorded information is read.

A track is a physical division of data in a disk drive, as used in the Cylinder-Head-Record (CCHHR) addressing mode of a CKD disk. The concept is concentric, through the physical platters, being a data circle per each cylinder of the whole disk drive. In other words, the number of tracks on a single surface in the drive exactly equals the number of cylinders of the drive.

Tracks are subdivided into blocks (or sectors, pages) (see: Storage block and Virtual page).

The term track is sometimes prefaced with the word logical (i.e. "3390-9 has 3 logical tracks per physical track") to emphasize that it is used as an abstract concept, not a track in the physical sense.

== See also ==
- Hard disk drive
- Disk sector
- Cylinder
