= Advanced Format =

Disk format and access using sector sizes larger than 512 bytes

Advanced Format (AF)
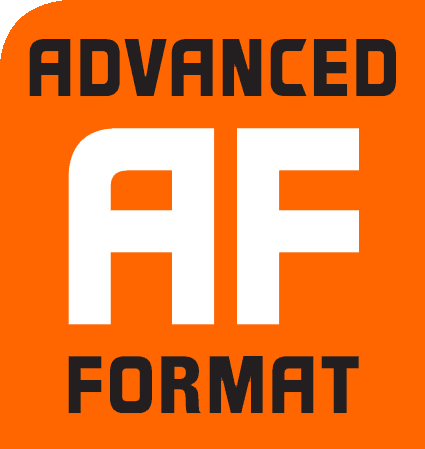
- Advanced Format 512e logo

Generation-one standard
- 4096 bytes (4 KiB) per sector

Generation-one categories
- 512 emulation (512e): 4K physical sectors on the drive media with 512 byte logical configuration
- 4K native (4Kn): 4K physical sectors on the drive media and 4K configuration reported to the host
- 4K-ready host: A host system which works equally well with legacy 512 as well as 512e hard disk drives

Year standard completed
- March 2010

Created by
- IDEMA Long Data Sector Committee, composed of Dell, Fujitsu (now Toshiba Storage Device Corporation), Hewlett-Packard, Hitachi Global Storage Technologies, IDEMA, LSI Corporation, Maxtor (now Seagate), Microsoft, Phoenix Technologies, Samsung, Seagate Technology, Western Digital

Advanced Format (AF) is any disk sector format used to store data in HDDs and SSDs that exceeds 528 bytes per sector, frequently 4096, 4112, 4160, or 4224-byte sectors. Larger sectors of an Advanced Format Drive (AFD) enable the integration of stronger error correction algorithms to maintain data integrity at higher storage densities.

== History ==
The use of long data sectors was suggested in 1998 in a technical paper issued by the National Storage Industry Consortium (NSIC) calling attention to the conflict between continuing increases in areal density and the traditional 512-byte-per-sector format used in hard disk drives. Without revolutionary breakthroughs in magnetic recording system technologies, areal densities, and with them the storage capacities, hard disk drives were projected to stagnate.

The storage industry trade organization, International Disk Drive Equipment and Materials Association (IDEMA), responded by organizing the IDEMA Long Data Sector Committee in 2000, where IDEMA and leading hardware and software suppliers collaborated on the definition and development of standards governing long data sectors, including methods by which compatibility with legacy computing components would be supported. In August 2005, Seagate shipped test drives with 1K physical sectors to industry partners for testing. In 2010, industry standards for the first official generation of long data sectors using a configuration of 4096 bytes per sector, or 4K, were completed. All hard drive manufacturers committed to shipping new hard drive platforms for desktop and notebook products with the Advanced Format sector formatting by January 2011.

Advanced Format was coined to cover what was expected to become several generations of long-data-sector technologies, and its logo was created to distinguish long-data-sector–based hard disk drives from those using legacy 512-byte sector. Enterprise disks can be formatted with additional 8-byte Data Integrity Fields, resulting in a 520 or 528-byte physical sectors.

== Overview ==
Comparison of 512- and 4096-byte sector formats
Description	512-byte sector	4096-byte sector
Gap, sync, address mark	15 bytes	
User data	512 bytes	4096 bytes
Error-correcting code	50 bytes	100 bytes
Total	577 bytes	4211 bytes
Efficiency	88.7%	97.3%

512-byte emulated device sector size
0	1	2	3	4	5	6	7	8	9	10	11	12	13	14	15
Physical sector 1								Physical sector 2							

Generation-one Advanced Format, 4K sector technology, uses the storage surface media more efficiently by combining data that would have been stored in eight 512-byte sectors into one single sector that is 4096 bytes in length. Key design elements of the traditional 512-byte sector architecture are maintained, specifically, the identification and synchronization marks at the beginning and the error correction coding (ECC) area at the end of the sector. Between the sector header and ECC areas, eight 512-byte sectors are combined, eliminating the need for redundant header areas between each individual chunk of 512-byte data. The Long Data Sector Committee selected the 4K block length for the first generation AF standard for several reasons, including its correspondence to the paging size used by processors and some operating systems as well as its correlation to the size of standard transactions in relational database systems.

Format efficiency gains resulting from the 4K sector structure range from 7 to 11 percent in physical platter space. The 4K format provides enough space to expand the ECC field from 50 to 100 bytes to accommodate new ECC algorithms. The enhanced ECC coverage improves the ability to detect and correct processed data errors beyond the 50-byte defect length associated with the 512-byte sector legacy format. The Advanced Format standard employs the same gap, sync and address mark configuration as the traditional 512-byte sector layout, but combines eight 512-byte sectors into one data field.

Hard disk drive format efficiency with Advanced Format 4K technology and distributed ECC

Having a huge number of legacy 512-byte-sector–based hard disk drives shipped up to the middle of 2010, many systems, programs and applications accessing the hard disk drive are designed around the 512-byte-per-sector convention. Early engagement with the Long Data Sector Committee provided the opportunity for component and software suppliers to prepare for the transition to Advanced Format.

For example, Windows Vista, Windows 7, Windows Server 2008, and Windows Server 2008 R2 (with certain hotfixes installed) support 512e format drives (but not 4Kn), as do contemporary versions of FreeBSD and Linux. Mac OS X Tiger and onwards can use Advanced Format drives and OS X Mountain Lion 10.8.2 additionally supports encrypting those. Windows 8 and Windows Server 2012 also support 4Kn Advanced Format. Oracle Solaris 10 and 11 support 4Kn and 512e hard disk drives for non-root ZFS file systems, while version 11.1 provides installation and boot support for 512e devices. Prior to Windows Vista, Windows 2000 and Windows XP use 4096 bytes as default allocation unit size when use NTFS to format local hard disks, but do not align to 4096-byte boundaries.

== Categories ==
Among the Advanced Format initiatives undertaken by the Long Data Sector Committee, methods to maintain backward compatibility with legacy computing solutions were also addressed. For this purpose, several categories of Advanced Format devices were created.

=== 512 emulation (512e) ===
Many host computer hardware and software components assume the hard drive is configured around 512-byte sector boundaries. This includes a broad range of items including chipsets, operating systems, database engines, hard drive partitioning and imaging tools, backup and file system utilities as well as a small fraction of other software applications. In order to maintain compatibility with legacy computing components, many hard disk drive suppliers support Advanced Format technologies on the recording media coupled with 512-byte conversion firmware. Hard drives configured with 4096-byte physical sectors with 512-byte firmware are referred to as Advanced Format 512e, or 512 emulation drives. On 512e drives, one LBA is equal to 512 bytes.

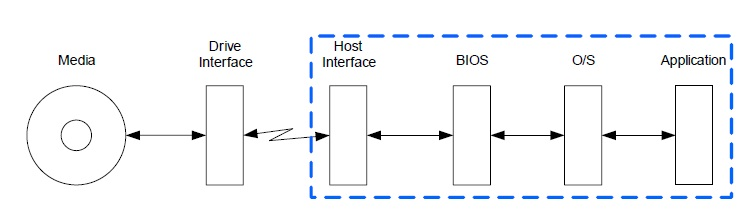
Potential areas using 512-byte-based code

The translation of the native 4096, 4112, 4160, or 4224-byte physical format (with 0, 8, 64, or 128-byte Data Integrity Fields) to a virtual 512, 520 or 528-byte increment is transparent to the entity accessing the hard disk drive. Read and write commands are issued to Advanced Format drives in the same format as legacy drives. However, during the read process, the Advanced Format hard drive loads the entire 4096-byte sector containing the requested 512-byte data into memory located on the drive. The emulation firmware extracts and re-formats the specific data into a 512-byte chunk before sending the data to the host. The entire process typically occurs with little or no degradation in performance.

The translation process is more complicated when writing data that is not a multiple of 4K or not aligned to a 4K boundary. In these instances, the hard drive must read the entire 4096-byte sector containing the targeted data into internal memory, integrate the new data into the previously existing data and then rewrite the entire 4096-byte sector onto the disk media. This operation, known as read-modify-write (RMW), can require additional revolution of the magnetic disks, resulting in a perceptible performance impact to the system user. Performance analysis conducted by IDEMA and the hard drive vendors indicates that approximately five to ten percent of all write operations in a typical business PC user environment may be misaligned and a RMW performance penalty incurred.

When using Advanced Format drives with legacy operating systems, it is important to realign the disk drive using software provided by the hard disk manufacturer. Disk realignment is necessary to avoid a performance degrading condition known as cluster straddling where a shifted partition causes filesystem clusters to span partial physical disk sectors. Since cluster-to-sector alignment is determined when creating hard drive partitions, the realignment software is used after partitioning the disk. This can help reduce the number of unaligned writes generated by the computing ecosystem. Further activities to make applications ready for the transition to Advanced Format technologies were spearheaded by the Advanced Format Technology Committee (formerly Long Data Sector Committee) and by the hard disk drive manufacturers.

=== 4K native (4Kn) ===
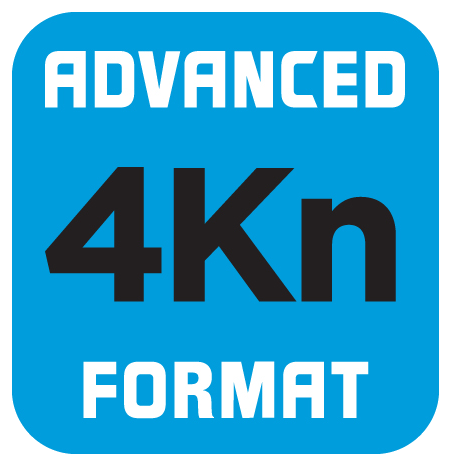
Advanced Format 4K native logo

For hard disk drives working in the 4K native mode, there is no emulation layer in place, and the disk media directly exposes its 4096, 4112, 4160, or 4224-byte physical sector size to the system firmware and operating system. That way, the externally visible logical sectors organization of the 4K native drives is directly mapped to their internal physical sectors organization. Since April 2014, enterprise-class 4K native hard disk drives have been available on the market.

Readiness of the support for 4096-byte logical sectors within operating systems differs among their types, vendors and versions. For example, Microsoft Windows supports 4K native drives since Windows 8 and Windows Server 2012 (both released in 2012) in UEFI. 4K native drives may work on older operating systems such as Windows 7, but cannot be used as boot drive.

Linux supports 4K native drives since the Linux kernel version 2.6.31 and util-linux-ng version 2.17 (released in 2009 and 2010, respectively).

The color version of the logo indicating a 4K native drive is somewhat different from the 512e logo, featuring four rounded corners, a blue background, and text "4Kn" at the center of the logo.

== See also ==
- Partition alignment
