= Count key data =

Direct access storage device data recording format

Count key data (CKD) is a direct-access storage device (DASD) (Note: Most commonly a hard disk drive.) data recording format introduced in 1964, by IBM with its IBM System/360 and still being emulated on IBM mainframes. It is a self-defining format with each data record represented by a Count Area that identifies the record and provides the number of bytes in an optional Key Area and an optional Data Area. This is in contrast to devices using fixed sector size or a separate format track.

Count key data (CKD) also refers to the set of channel commands (collectively Channel Command Words, CCWs) that are generated by an IBM mainframe for execution by a DASD subsystem employing the CKD recording format. The initial set of CKD CCWs, introduced in 1964, was substantially enhanced and improved into the 1990s.

== CKD track format ==
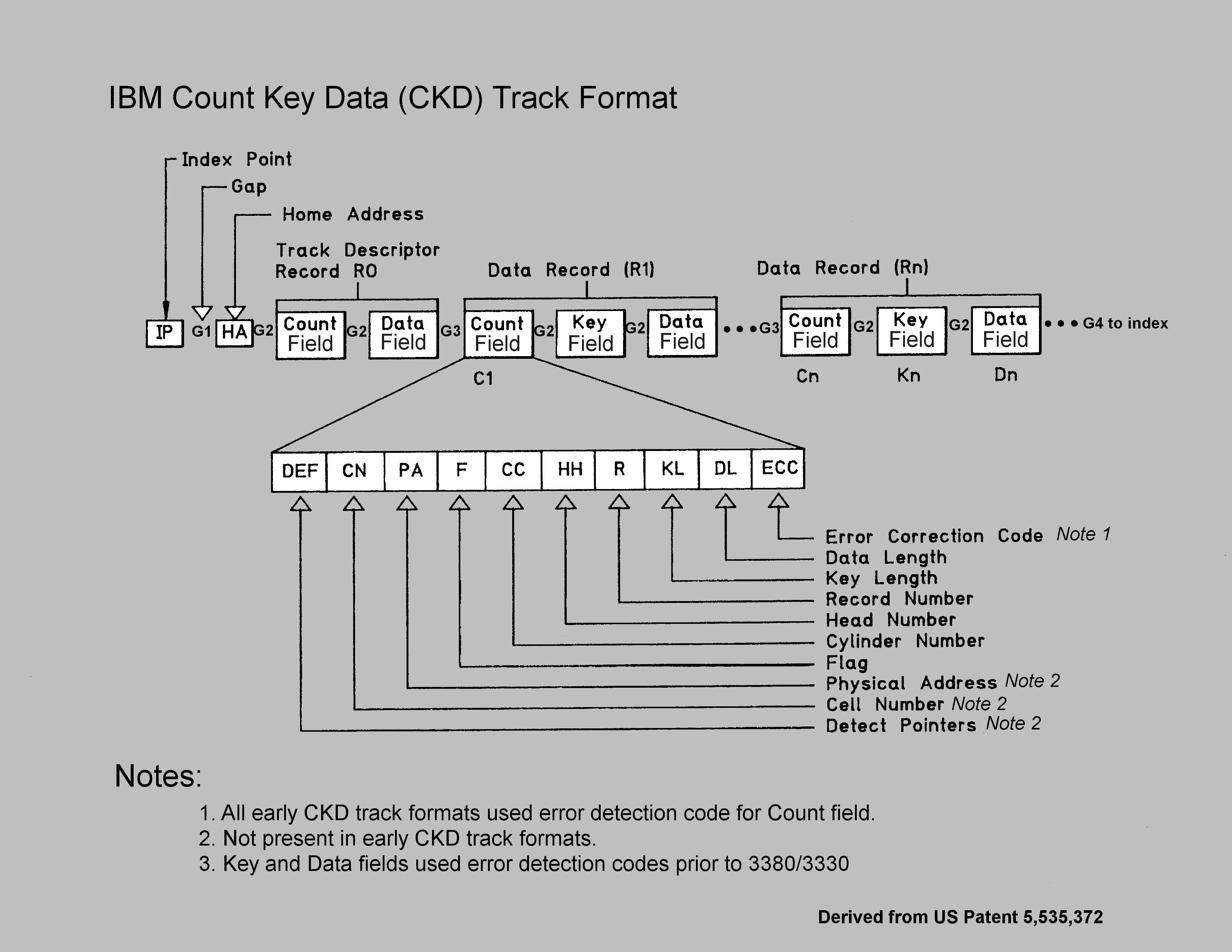
Block diagram of count key data track format used on IBM mainframe computers beginning with S/360 shipment in 1965

The reason for CKD track format is to allow data field lengths to vary, each recorded block of data on a DASD track, called a record has an associated count field which identifies the record and indicates the size of the key, if used (user-defined up to 255 bytes), and the size of the data area, if used. (Note: data length 0 indicates EOF) The count field has the identification of the record (Note: Because records are variable length and because the record number on the track need not be unique, the record number does not correspond to an angular displacement.) in cylinder-head-record format, the length of the key, and the length of the data. The key may be omitted or consist of a string of characters.

"The beginning of a track is signalled when the index marker (index point) is detected. ... The marker is automatically recognized by a special sensing device." Following the index marker is the home address, which indicates the location of this track on the disk, and contains other control information internal to the control unit. A fixed-length gap follows the home address. Next, each track contains a Record 0 (R0), the track descriptor record, which is "designed to enable the entire content of a track to be moved to alternate tracks if a portion of the primary track becomes defective." Following R0 are the data records, separated by gaps.

Because of the gaps and other information, the recorded space is larger than that required for just the count data, key data, or user data. IBM provides a "reference card" for each device, which can be used to compute the number of records per track for various key and data field sizes, and to optimize the capacity of the device. Later, programs were written to do these calculations. Because records are normally not split between tracks, specification of an incorrect record size create problems.

Most often, the key is omitted and the record is located sequentially or by direct cylinder-head-record addressing. If it is present, the key is any data used to find the record, usually using the Search Key Equal or Search Key High or Equal CCW. The key (and hence the record) is locatable via hardware commands. Since the introduction of IBM's System/360 in 1964, nearly all IBM large and intermediate system DASDs have used the count key data record format.

The advantages of count key data record format are:

- The record size can be exactly matched to the application data block sizes
- CPU and memory requirements can be reduced by exploiting search-key commands.
- IBM CKD subsystems initially operated synchronously with the system channel and can process information in the gaps between the various fields, thereby achieving higher performance by avoiding the redundant transfer of information to the host. Both synchronous and asynchronous operations are supported on later subsystems.

Reduced CPU and memory prices and higher device and interface speeds have somewhat nullified the advantages of CKD, and it is retained only because IBM's z/OS operating system does not fully support sector-oriented interfaces.

Originally CKD records had a one-to-one correspondence to a physical track of a DASD device; however over time the records have become more and more virtualized such that in modern IBM mainframes there is no longer a direct correspondence between a CKD record ID and the physical layout of a track.

== IBM's CKD DASD subsystems ==
=== Packaging ===
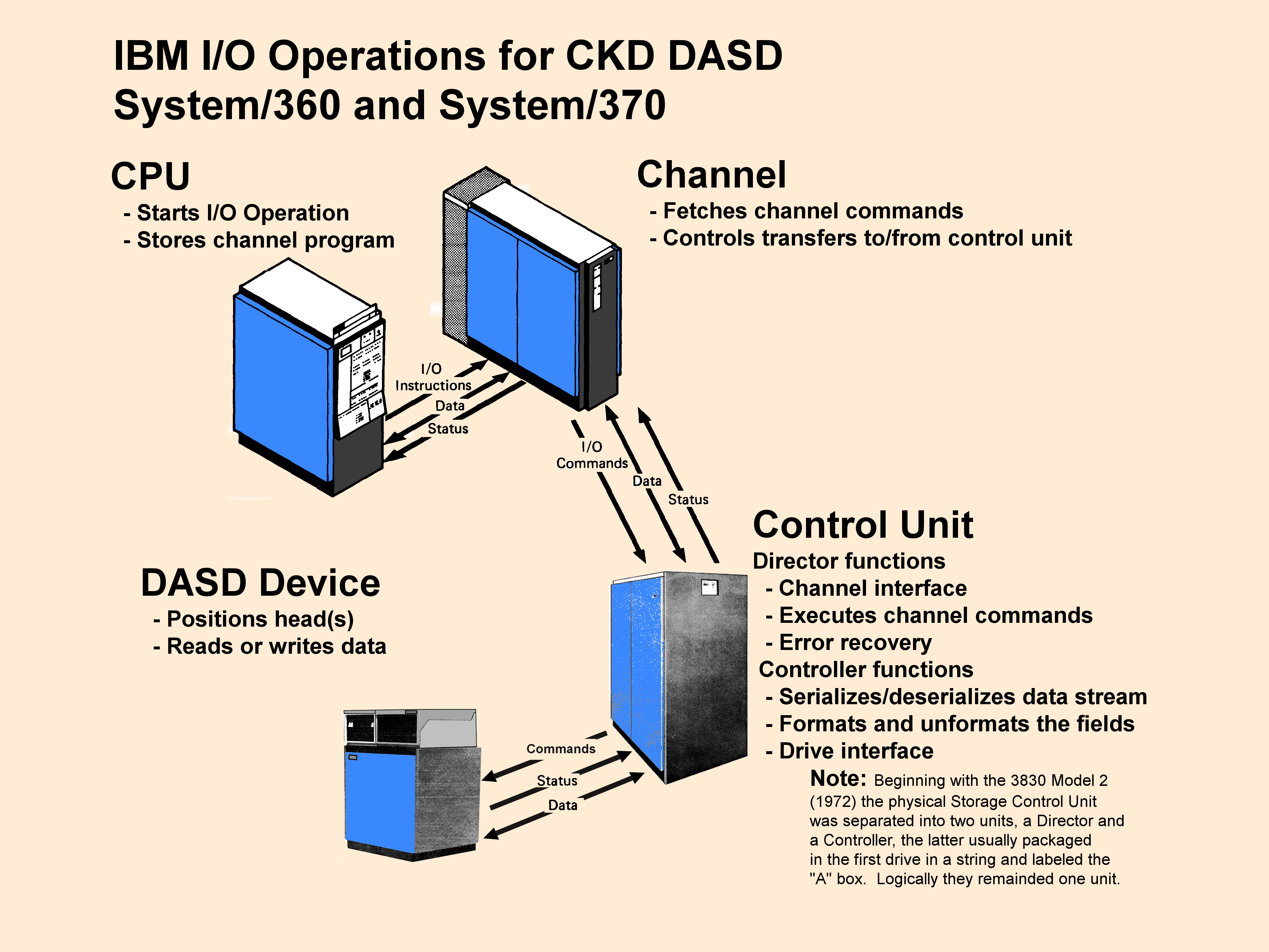
IBM S/360 & S/370 Input/Output operations for CKD DASD showing channel, storage control unit and DASD device

Initially there was a high degree of correspondence between the logical view of DASD accesses and the actual hardware, as shown in the illustration. Three digit labels were typically affixed (Note: In some early DASD the label was on a plug which allowed the address to be moved between DASD) to identify the address of channel, control unit and device.

On low end systems the Channel and the Control Unit were frequently physically integrated but remained logically separate. IBM's New Attachment Strategy beginning with the 3830 Model 2 in 1972 physically separated the SCU into two physical entities, a director and a controller while keeping them logically the same. The controller handles the CKD track formatting and is packaged with the first drive or drives in a string of drives and having a model number with the letter "A" as a prefix, an "A-Unit" (or "A-Box") as in 3350 Model A2 containing a controller and two DASDs. DASD without a controller, that is B-Units, have a "B" prefix in their model number.

CKD subsystems (Note: That is the combination of an SCU and one or more DASDs or an A-Unit with any attached B-Units.) and directors were offered by IBM and plug compatible competitors until at least 1996 (2301 to 3390 Model 9); in total 22 unique (Note: A unique combination of number of tracks and maximum track length. With this definition a double density DASD counts as a unique DASD.) DASD offered by IBM configured in at least 35 different subsystem configurations. Plug-compatible offered many of the same DASD including 4 CKD subsystems featuring unique DASD. (Note: double density 2314, triple density 3330, double density 3350 and solid state disk)

=== Programming ===
Access to specific classes of I/O devices by an IBM mainframe is under the control of Channel Command Words (CCWs), some of which are generic (e.g. No Operation) but many of which are specific to the type of I/O device (e.g. Read Backwards for a tape drive). The group of CCWs defined by IBM for DASD fall into five broad categories:

- Control – control of the DASD including the path thereto
- Sense – sense status of the DASD including the path thereto; some sense commands affect the status of the controller and DASD in a fashion more in keeping with a control command, e.g., RESERVE, RELEASE
- Write – write information to the controller or DASD (which may be buffered or cached in the path)
- Search (Note: Technically writes) – compare information from the CPU with information stored in the DASD; the Channel operates in the Write mode while the storage unit operates in the Read mode.
- Read – read information from the DASD (which may be buffered or cached in the path)

CKD CCWs are the specific set of CCWs used to access CKD DASD subsystems. This is in contrast to fixed block architecture (FBA) CCWs which are used to access FBA DASD subsystems.

CKD DASD are addressed like other Input/Output devices; for System/360 and System/370 DASD are addressed directly, through channels and the associated control units (SCU or Storage Control Unit), initially using three hexadecimal digits, one for channel and two for control unit and device, providing addressing for up to 16 channels, for up to 256 DASD access mechanisms/channel and 4,096 DASD addresses total. Modern IBM mainframes use four hexadecimal digits as an arbitrary subchannel number within a channel subsystem subset, whose definition includes the actual channels, control units and device, providing addressing for up to 65,536 DASD per channel subsystem subset. In practice, physical and design constraints of the channel and of the controllers limited the maximum number of attached DASD attachable to a system to a smaller amount than the number that could be addressed.

=== Block size determination ===
One aspect of systems design was determining optimal block (physical record) sizes for datasets, although "optimal" was often a trade-off between disk and main storage usage. DASD device capacity was described by a table on a pocket-sized reference card for a specific device. Here is an example for a 2311-1

DASD Capacity and Transmission Time
Bytes per Record min–max	Records per track–cylinder–module	Transmission time (msec) min–max
5–6	42–420–84000	0.03–0.04
7–8	41–410–82000	0.04–0.05
...	...	...
812–1111	3–30–6000	5.21–7.12
1112–1720	2–20–4000	7.13–11.03
1721–3605	1–10–2000	11.03–23.11

Any space on a track too small to fit a complete block was normally wasted. Using 6-byte blocks, a track could hold 42×6 or 252 bytes, while with 3605-byte records (full track blocking) the track could hold 3605 bytes. On the other hand, a 1721-byte record was still written one-per-track. Optimum disk utilization was achieved by using a block size with a whole number of records as close as possible to but less than 1720 or 3605 bytes (half- or full-track). However, this had to be balanced with main storage usage, since a program with a number of open files would need buffer space for one or two blocks per file.

This chart described records without keys. Since keys required an additional gap on disk, a separate chart was used.

Programs were written that accepted the required record size and device type as input and computed optimum block sizes.

== Initial CKD feature set ==
The initial feature set provided by IBM with its 1964 introduction of the CKD track format and associated CCWs included: .

- Defective/Alternative Track – enables an alternate track to replace a defective track transparent to the access method in use.
- Record overflow – AKA track overflow – The Write Special Count, Key and Data CCW can write a record segment that is logically part of a record segment on the next track. While an individual record segment can not exceed the maximum track length of a DASD track, a sequence of record segments is not so limited.
- Multitrack operations – specific CCWs can continue onto the next sequential tracks up to the end of the cylinder.
- Command chaining – CCWs could be chained together to construct complex channel programs. The gaps in a CKD track format provided sufficient time between the commands so that all channel and SCU activity necessary to complete a command can be performed in the a gap between appropriate fields. Such programs can search a large amount of information stored on a DASD, upon successful completion returning only the desired data and thereby freeing CPU resources for other activity. This mode of operating synchronous to the gap was later enhanced by additional CCWs enabling a nonsynchronous mode of operation.
- Data chaining – when the current CCW has read or written the specified number of bytes, data chaining "causes the storage area of the next CCW to be used with the current I/O operation. The use of data chaining allows data to be transferred to or from noncontiguous areas of storage in a single I/O operation."
- Channel switching – an SCU can be shared between channels – initially two channel switching was provided and it was expanded to up to eight channels in later SCUs. The channels can be on the same or different CPUS.

A Scan feature set was also provided but not continued into future CKD subsystems beyond the 2314.

Forty one CCWs implemented the feature set:

IBM S/360 DASD Channel Commands (Note: Derived from IBM System/360 Reference Data (Green) Card, GX20-1703-9)
Command Class	Command‡	2301	2302	2303 7320 (Note: The 2302 replaced the 7230. Datamation, March 1966, p. 81)	2311	2321	2314 2319	MT Off	MT On †	Count Length
Control	No Op	S	S	S	S	S	S	03		
Control	Seek	S	S	S	S	S	S	07		6
Control	Seek Cylinder	S	S	S	S	S	S	0B		6
Control	Seek Head	S	S	S	S	S	S	1B		6
Control	Set File Mask	S	S	S	S	S	S	1F		1
Control	Space Count	S	S	S	S	S	S	0F		3
Control	Recalibrate				S		S	13		Not zero
Control	Restore					S		17		Not zero
Sense	Sense I/O	S	S	S	S	S	S	04		6
Sense	Release Device	O	O	O	O	O	O	94		6
Sense	Reserve Device	O	O	O	O	O	O	B4		6
Search	Home Address EQ	S	S	S	S	S	S	39	B9	4 (usually)
Search	Identifier EQ	S	S	S	S	S	S	31	B1	5 (usually)
Search	Identifier HI	S	S	S	S	S	S	51	D1	5 (usually)
Search	Identifier EQ or HI	S	S	S	S	S	S	71	FI	5 (usually)
Search	Key EQ	S	S	S	S	S	S	29	A9	1 to 255
Search	Key HI	S	S	S	S	S	S	49	C9	1 to 255
Search	Key EQ or HI	S	S	S	S	S	S	69	E9	1 to 255
Search	Key & Data EQ		O		O	O	S	2D	AD	See Note 2
Search	Key & Data HI		O		O	O	S	4D	CD	See Note 2
Search	Key & Data EQ or HI		O		O	O	S	6D	ED	See Note 2
Continue Scan (see Note 1)	Search EQ		O		O	O	S	25	A5	See Note 2
Continue Scan (see Note 1)	Search HI		O		O	O	S	45	C5	See Note 2
Continue Scan (see Note 1)	Search HI or EQ		O		O	O	S	65	E5	See Note 2
Continue Scan (see Note 1)	Set Compare		O		O	O	S	35	B5	See Note 2
Continue Scan (see Note 1)	Set Compare		O		O	O	S	75	F5	See Note 2
Continue Scan (see Note 1)	No Compare		O		O	O	S	55	D5	See Note 2
Read	Home Address	S	S	S	S	S	S	1A	9A	5
Read	Count	S	S	S	S	S	S	12	92	8
Read	Record 0	S	S	S	S	S	S	16	96	Number of bytes transferred
Read	Data	S	S	S	S	S	S	06	86	
Read	Key & Data	S	S	S	S	S	S	0E	8E	
Read	Count. Key & Data	S	S	S	S	S	S	1E	9E	
Read	IPL	S	S	S	S	S	S	02		
Write	Home Address	S	S	S	S	S	S	19		5 (usually)
Write	Record 0	S	S	S	S	S	S	15		8*KL*DL of RO
Write	Count, Key & Data	S	S	S	S	S	S	1D		8+KL+DL
Write	Special Count, Key & Data	S	S	S	S	S	S	01		8+KL+DL
Write	Data	S	S	S	S	S	S	05		DL
Write	Key & Data	S	S	S	S	S	S	0D		KL*DL
Write	Erase	S	S	S	S	S	S	11		8*KL*DL
Total CCWs	41	30	39	30	40	40	40			

Notes:

O = optional feature
S = standard feature
MT = multitrack: when supported CCW will continue to operate on next heads in sequence to end of cylinder
‡ = TIC (Transfer In Channel) and other standard commands not shown.
† = code same as MT Off except as listed
1. File Scan Feature (9 CCWs) only available on 2841 for 2302, 2311 and 2321; they were not available on subsequent DASD controllers for DASD later than 2314.
2. Count is number of bytes in search argument, including mask bytes

The CCWs were initially executed by two types of SCU attached to the system's high speed Selector Channels. The 2820 SCU controlled the 2301 Drum while the 2841 SCU controlled combinations of the 2302 Disk Storage, 2311 Disk Drive, 2321 Data Cell and/or 7320 Drum Storage. IBM quickly replaced the 7320 with the faster and larger 2303.

Subsequently, the feature set was implemented on the 2314 family of storage controls and an integrated attachment of the System 370 Model 25.

The following example of a channel program reads a disk record identified by a Key field. The track containing the record and the desired value of the key is known. The SCU will search the track to find the requested record. In this example <> indicate that the channel program contains the storage address of the specified field.

  SEEK             <cylinder/head number>
  SEARCH KEY EQUAL <key value>
  TIC              *-8 Back to search if not equal
  READ DATA        <buffer> 

The TIC (transfer in channel) will cause the channel program to branch to the SEARCH command until a record with a matching key (or the end of the track) is encountered. When a record with a matching key is found the SCU will include Status Modifier in the channel status, causing the channel to skip the TIC CCW; thus the channel program will not branch and the channel will execute the READ command.

== Block multiplexer channel enhancements ==
The block multiplexor channel was introduced beginning in 1971 on some high end System/360 systems along with the 2835 Control Unit and associated 2305 DASD, This channel was then standard on IBM System/370 and subsequent mainframes; when contrasted to the prior Selector channel it offered performance improvements for high speed devices such as DASD, including:

=== Multiple Requesting ===
Allowed multiple channel programs, (Note: In the case of the 2305, up to 8 channel programs for the same disk drive and 16 on the same SCU) to be simultaneously active in the facility as opposed to only one with a Selector channel. The actual number of subchannels provided depends upon the system model and its configuration. Sometimes described as disconnected command chaining, the control unit could disconnect at various times during a chained set of CCWs, for example, disconnection for a Seek CCW, freeing the channel for another subchannel.

=== Command Retry ===
The channel and storage control under certain conditions can inter-operate to cause a CCW to be retried without an I/O interruption. This procedure is initiated by the storage control and used to recover from correctable errors.

=== Rotational Position Sensing ===
Rotational position sensing (RPS) was implemented with two new CCWs, SET SECTOR and READ SECTOR enabled the channel to delay command chaining until the disk rotated to a specified angular track position. RPS permits channel disconnection during most of the rotational delay period and thus contributes to increased channel utilization. The control unit implements RPS by dividing each track into equal angular segments.

=== Example Channel Program ===
The following example channel program will format a track with an R0 and three CKD records.

  SEEK             <cylinder/head number>
  SET FILE MASK    <allow write operations>
  SET SECTOR       <sector number=0>
  WRITE R0         <cylinder/head/R0, key length=0, data length=6>
  WRITE CKD        <cylinder/head/R1, key length, data length>
  WRITE CKD        <cylinder/head/R2, key length, data length>
  WRITE CKD        <cylinder/head/R3, key length, data length>  

In this example the Record 0 conforms to IBM programming standards. With a block multiplexer channel the channel is free during the time the DASD is seeking and again while the disk rotates to beginning of the track. A selector channel would be busy for the entire duration of this sample program.

== Defect skipping ==
Defect skipping allows data to be written before and after one of more surface defects (Note: Number of skippable defects varies by DASD model) allowing all of a track to be used except for that portion that has the defect. This also eliminates the time that was formerly required to seek to an alternate track. Only a limited number of defects could be skipped so alternate tracks remained supported for those tracks with excess defects.

Defect skipping was introduced in 1974 with the 3340 attached via the 3830 Model 2 Storage Control Unit or integrated attachments on small systems. Defect skipping was essentially a factory only feature until 1981 when CCWs for management along with associated utilities were released.

== Dynamic paths ==
First introduced with the 3380 DASD on the 3880 Storage Control Unit in 1981 the feature was included with the later CKD DASD subsystems. The dynamic path selection function controls operation of the two controllers, including simultaneous data transfer over the two paths. When supported by the operating system, each controller can serve as an alternate path in the event the other controller is unavailable.

Three additional commands, Set Path Group ID, Sense Path Group ID, and Suspend Multipath Reconnection, are used to support attachment of the 3380 Models having two controllers at the head of a string.

The Set Path Group ID command, with the dynamic path selection (DPS) function, provides greater flexibility in operations on reserved devices. Once a path group for a device has been established, it may be accessed over any path which is a member of the group to which it is reserved. In addition, on 370-XA systems which set the multipath mode bit in the function control byte (byte 0) to a 1, block multiplex reconnections will occur on the first available path which is a member of the group over which the channel program was initiated (regardless of the reservation state of the device).

If the controller designated in the I/O address is busy or disabled, the dynamic path selection allows an alternate path to the device to be established via another storage director and the other controller in the model AA.

== Nonsynchronous operation ==
Prior to the 1981 introduction of the 3880 director, CKD records were synchronously accessed, all activities required that one CCW be ended and the next initiated in the gaps between the CKD fields. The gap size placed limitations on cable length but did provide for very high performance since complex chains of CCWs could be performed by the subsystem in real time without use of CPU memory or cycles.

Nonsynchronous operation provided by the Extended CKD ("ECKD") set of CCWs removed the gap timing constraint. The five additional ECKD CCWs are Define Extent, Locate Record, Write Update Data, Write Update Key and Data, and Write CKD Next Track.

In nonsynchronous operation, the transfer of data between the channel and the storage control is not synchronized with the transfer of data between the storage control and the device. Channel programs can be executed such that channel and storage control activities required to end execution of one command and advance to the next do not have to occur during the inter-record gap between two adjacent fields. An intermediate buffer in the storage control allows independent operations between the channel and the device. A major advantage of ECKDs is far longer cables; depending upon application it may improve performance.

ECKD CCWs are supported on all subsequent CKD subsystems.

This example nonsynchronous channel program reads records R1 and R2 from track X'0E' in cylinder X'007F'. Both records have a key length of 8 and a data length of X'64' (100_{10}) bytes.

  Define Extent       <extent= X'007F 0000' through track X'0081 000E'>
  Locate Record       <cylinder = X'007F', head = X'000E'
  Read Key and Data   <key record = X'001038'>
  Read Data           <record = X'001108'>

== Caching ==
Caching was first introduced in S/370 DASD CKD subsystems by Memorex (1978) and StorageTek (Note: STK 8890 CyberCache for STK 3350 compatibles) (1981). IBM subsequently introduced the Speed Matching Buffer (SMB) on the 3880 Models 2 and 3 to allow attaching 3375 and 3380 drives to slower channels and formally introduced caching in late 1981 on the 3880 Model 13 for models of the 3380 with dynamic pathing. (Note: Simultaneously announced was the 3880-11 using its cache in a paging mode 3350s as paging devices)

The cache is dynamically managed by an algorithm; high activity data is accessed from the high-performance cache and low activity data is accessed from less-expensive DASD storage. A large memory in the Director, the cache, is divided into track slots that store data from the 3380 tracks. A smaller area is a directory that contains entries that allow data to be located in the cache.

Caches were also provided on subsequently introduced storage controls.

== Other extensions ==
Over time a number of path control, diagnostic and/or error recovery CCWs were implemented on one or more storage controls. For example:

- Unconditional Reserve allowed the releasing a device reserved to another channel and reserving the device to the channel issuing the command.
- Read Multiple Count Key Data could more efficiently read full tracks allowing for more efficient backups.

== Beyond System/370 ==
Reduced CPU and memory prices and higher device and interface speeds have somewhat nullified the advantages of CKD, and support continues by IBM to this date because its flagship operating system z/OS continues to use CKD CCWs for many functions.

Originally CKD records had a one-to-one correspondence to a physical track of a DASD device; however over time the records have become more and more virtualized such that in a modern IBM mainframe there is no longer a direct correspondence between the a CKD record ID and a physical layout of a track. An IBM mainframe constructs CKD track images in memory and executes the ECKD and CKD channel programs against the image. To bridge between the native fixed block sized disks and the variable length ECKD/CKD record format, the CKD track images in memory are mapped onto a series of fixed blocks suitable for transfer to and from an FBA disk subsystem.

Of the 83 CKD CCWs implemented for System/360 and System/370 channels 56 are emulated on System/390 and later systems.

== See also ==
- Block (data storage)
- Data set (IBM mainframe)
- Fixed-block architecture (FBA)
- Record (computer science)
- Track (disk drive)
- Volume Table of Contents (VTOC)
