= ReFS =

Proprietary file system developed by Microsoft

- Developer: Microsoft
- Full name: Resilient File System
- Introduced: 1 August 2012; 14 years ago with Windows Server 2012

Structures
- Directory contents: B+ tree

Limits
- Max volume size: 35 petabytes by Windows; 2^{78} bytes with 16KB cluster size (2^{64} × 16 × 2^{10}) in theory
- Max file size: 35 petabytes by Windows; 2^{64}−1 bytes in theory

Features
- Attributes: Yes
- Transparent compression: No
- Data deduplication: Yes, since v3.2 debuting in 2016 v1709
- Copy-on-write: Yes

Other
- Supported operating systems: Windows Server 2012 and later; Windows 8.1 and later (ReFS volume creation ability removed in Windows 10's 2017 Fall Creators Update, except for Windows 10 Enterprise and Pro for Workstations)
- Website: learn.microsoft.com/en-US/windows-server/storage/refs/refs-overview

Resilient File System (ReFS), codenamed "Protogon", is a Microsoft proprietary file system introduced with Windows Server 2012 with the intent of becoming the "next generation" file system after NTFS.

ReFS was designed to overcome problems that had become significant over the years since NTFS was conceived, relating to changes in data storage requirements. These requirements arose from two major changes in storage systems and usage (the size of storage in use large or massive arrays of multi-terabyte drives now common), and the need for continual reliability. As a result, the file system needs to be self-repairing (to prevent disk checking from being impractically slow or disruptive), along with abstraction or virtualization between physical disks and logical volumes.

The key design advantages of ReFS include automatic integrity checking and data scrubbing, elimination of the need for running chkdsk, protection against data degradation, built-in handling of hard disk drive failure and redundancy, integration of RAID functionality, a switch to copy/allocate on write for data and metadata updates, handling of very long paths and filenames, and storage virtualization and pooling, including almost arbitrarily sized logical volumes (unrelated to the physical sizes of the used drives).

== Comparison with NTFS ==
=== Major new features ===
==== Improved reliability for on-disk structures ====
ReFS uses B+ trees for all on-disk structures, including all metadata and file data. Metadata and file data are organized into tables similar to a relational database. The file size, number of files in a folder, total volume size, and number of folders in a volume are limited by 64-bit numbers; as a result, in practice ReFS supports a maximum file size of 35 petabytes, and a maximum volume size of 35 petabytes. The theoretical maximum is way beyond that however not even Windows supports ReFS volumes with the full theoretical limits. The design allows for a theoretical maximum of a single volume of 2^78 bytes with 16KB cluster size (2^64 * 16 * 2^10) with a maximum of 2^64-1 bytes for a single file. That maximum volume size is currently soft limited by Windows’ stack addressing being limited to 2^64 bytes; a maximum path length of 32K (soft limited to 255 unicode characters on Windows to align with NTFS and because of restrictions in some older APIs for handling file paths); a maximum of 2^64 directories on a single volume; 2^64 files per directory; a single storage pool is limited to a maximum of 4 PB. It as well as all other filesystems supported by Windows are defined within the Open Specification.

==== Built-in resilience ====
ReFS employs an allocation-on-write update strategy for metadata, which allocates new chunks for every update transaction and uses large IO batches. All ReFS metadata have 64-bit checksums which are stored independently. The file data can have an optional checksum in a separate "integrity stream", which used a modified CRC-32C algorithm to check allocation units, in which case the file update strategy also implements allocation-on-write for file data; this is controlled by a new "integrity" attribute applicable to both files and directories. If file data or metadata become corrupt, the file can be deleted without taking the whole volume offline for maintenance, and then be restored from the backup. As a result of built-in resiliency, administrators do not need to periodically run error-checking tools such as CHKDSK when using ReFS. In contrast, NTFS only calculates a checksum for metadata, the check for sectors is done by storage hardware (such as sector CRC-32 command of SATA and NVMe).

==== Compatibility with existing APIs and technologies ====
ReFS supports only a subset of NTFS features, and only supports Win32 APIs that are "widely adopted". It does not require new system APIs, and most file system filters continue to work with ReFS volumes. ReFS supports many existing Windows and NTFS features such as BitLocker encryption, Access Control Lists, USN Journal, change notifications, symbolic links, junction points, mount points, reparse points, volume snapshots, file IDs, and oplock. ReFS seamlessly integrates with Storage Spaces, a storage virtualization layer that allows data mirroring and striping, as well as sharing storage pools between machines. ReFS resiliency features enhance the mirroring feature provided by Storage Spaces and can detect whether any mirrored copies of files become corrupt using a data scrubbing process, which periodically reads all mirror copies and verifies their checksums, then replaces bad copies with good ones.

Microsoft Windows and Windows Server include ReFSUtil, a command-line utility that can be used to diagnose heavily damaged ReFS volumes, identify remaining files, and copy those files to another volume.

=== NTFS features missing from ReFS ===
Some NTFS features are not implemented in ReFS. These include object IDs, 8.3 filename, NTFS compression, transactional NTFS, extended attributes, volume shrinking, and disk quotas. Dynamic disks with mirrored or striped volumes are replaced with mirrored or striped storage pools provided by Storage Spaces; however, automated error-correction is only supported on mirrored spaces. Data deduplication was missing in early versions of ReFS. It was implemented in v3.2, debuting in Windows Server v1709. The partition cannot be shrunk and it cannot be used to install Windows.

Support for alternate data streams, hard links and Encrypting File System (EFS) was initially not implemented in ReFS. In Windows 8.1 64-bit and Server 2012 R2, the file system gained support for alternate data streams, with lengths of up to 128K, and automatic correction of corruption when integrity streams are used on parity spaces. ReFS had initially been unsuitable for Microsoft SQL Server instance allocation due to the absence of alternate data streams. In Windows 11, version 24H2 and Windows Server 2025, ReFS version 3.14 introduced support for file-level encryption.

== Implementations ==
ReFS was initially added to Windows Server 2012 only, with the aim of gradual migration to consumer systems in future versions; this was achieved as of Windows 8.1. The initial versions lacked some of the NTFS features, such as disk quotas, alternate data streams, and extended attributes. Some of these were implemented in later versions of ReFS.

In early versions (2012–2013), ReFS was similar to or slightly faster than NTFS in most tests, but far slower when full integrity checking was enabled, a result attributed to the relative newness of ReFS.

The ability to create ReFS volumes was removed in Windows 10's 2017 Fall Creators Update for all editions except Enterprise and Pro for Workstations.

Starting with Windows Server 2022 and Windows 11 build 22557, the Windows Boot Manager natively supports ReFS, allowing the system to be installed and run in a special way on a volume formatted with ReFS v3. If it is a volume formatted with ReFS v1, it cannot be booted with ReFS. Since Windows Server and Windows 11 future platform preview builds (build 29000 series), the install to (and boot from) ReFS volume features are greatly improved. However it's still experimental and may cause software compatibility and system unstable problems.

Starting with Windows 11 build 22621.2338, ReFS is re-introduced via a Dev Drive feature; allowing fixed storage drives and VHDs to be formatted as ReFS, with special file and Microsoft Defender policies added during use.

The cluster size of a ReFS volume is either 4 KB or 64 KB.

== History ==
=== Server 2016 ===
At the Storage Developer Conference 2015, a Microsoft developer presented enhancements of ReFS expected to be released with Windows Server 2016 and included in Technical Preview 4, titled "ReFS v2". It highlighted that ReFS now included capabilities for very high speed moving, reordering, and cloning of blocks between files (which can be done for all blocks of a file). This is particularly needed for virtualization, and is stated to allow fast provisioning, diff merging, and tiering. Other enhancements cover the redo log (for synchronous disk writes), parallelization, efficient tracking of uninitialized sparse data and files, and efficient 4k I/O.

=== Server 2022 ===
Windows Server 2022 (using ReFS version 3.7) supports file-level snapshots.

Windows Insider Preview 22H2 and 23H2 (builds 226** and 25*** using ReFS version 3.9) support ReFS compression using LZ4 and zstd algorithms.

=== Server 2025 ===
Windows Server 2025 (using ReFS version 3.14) supports Encrypted File System.

=== Server vNext ===
Windows Server vNext Insider Preview build 29531 (using ReFS version 3.15) enables ReFS booting; this requires a Windows Recovery Environment (WinRE) partition that is at least 2 GB.

=== Versions ===
ReFS has some different versions, with various degrees of compatibility between operating system versions. Aside from development versions of the filesystem, usually, later operating system versions can mount filesystems created with earlier OS versions (backwards compatibility). Some features may not be compatible with the feature set of the OS. The version, cluster size and other features of the filesystem can be queried with the command fsutil fsinfo refsinfo volumename.

- 1.1: The original version, formatted by Windows Server 2012.
- 1.2: Default version if formatted by Windows 8.1, Windows 10 RTM to v1607, Windows Server 2012 R2, and when specified ReFSv1 on Windows Server 2016. Can use alternate data streams under Windows Server 2012 R2.
- 2.0: Default version formatted by Windows Server 2016 TP2 and TP3. Could not be mounted in Windows 10 Build 10130 and later, or Windows Server 2016 TP4 and later.
- 3.0: Default version formatted by Windows Server 2016 TP4 and TP5.
- 3.1: Default version formatted by Windows Server 2016 RTM.
- 3.2: Default version formatted by Windows 10 v1703 and Windows Server Insider Preview build 16237. Can be formatted with Windows 10 Insider Preview 15002 or later (though only became the default somewhere between 15002 and 15019). Supports deduplication in the server version.
- 3.3: Default version formatted by Windows 10 Enterprise v1709 (ReFS volume creation ability removed from all editions except Enterprise and Pro for Workstations starting with build 16226; read/write ability remains) and Windows Server version 1709 (starting with Windows 10 Enterprise Insider Preview build 16257 and Windows Server Insider Preview build 16257).
- 3.4: Default version formatted by Windows 10 Pro for Workstations/Enterprise v1803 and newer, also server versions (including the long-time support version Windows Server 2019). For Windows 10 Pro 22H2 build 19045 and previous, ReFS is unavailable.
- 3.5: Default version formatted by Windows 11 Enterprise Insider Preview (build 19536 or newer); adds support for hard links (only on fresh formatted volume; not supported on volumes upgraded from previous versions).
- 3.6: Default version formatted by Windows 11 Enterprise Insider Preview (build 21292 or newer) and Windows Server Insider Preview (build 20282 or newer)
- 3.7: Default version formatted by Windows 11 Enterprise Insider Preview (build 21313 or newer) and Windows Server Insider Preview (build 20303 or newer). Also, the version shipped with the final releases of Windows Server 2022 and Windows 11. Added file-level snapshot (only available in Server 2022).
- 3.9: Default version formatted by Windows 11 Enterprise Insider Preview (build 22598 or newer) and Windows Server Insider Preview (build 25099 or newer). Added post process compression with LZ4 and ZSTD and transparent decompression.
- 3.10: Default version formatted by Windows 11 Enterprise Insider Preview and Windows Server Insider Preview (build 25324 or newer).
- 3.12: Default version formatted by Windows 11 Enterprise Insider Preview (build 26002 or newer).
- 3.14: Default version formatted by Windows 11 (build 26047 and newer). Added support for Encrypted File System.
- 3.15: Default version formatted by Windows Server vNext Insider Preview build 29531.

== Known problems ==
Issues identified or suggested for ReFS, when running on Storage Spaces, include:

- Adding thin-provisioned ReFS on top of Storage Spaces (according to a 2012 pre-release article) can fail in a non-graceful manner, in which the volume without warning becomes inaccessible or unmanageable. This can happen, for example, if the physical disks underlying a storage space became too full. Smallnetbuilder comments that, in such cases, recovery could be "prohibitive" as a "breakthrough in theory" is needed to identify storage space layouts and recover them, which is required before any ReFS recovery of file system contents can be started; therefore it recommends using backups as well.
- Poor backward compatibility handling. Windows automatically upgrades any ReFS volumes it sees to the current version of ReFS, without requiring any user interaction or confirmation. This can cause volumes to be unreadable with older versions of Windows.

== Comparison with other file systems ==
ReFS like ZFS, Bcachefs, and Btrfs are designed to integrate data protection, snapshots, and background error correction.

In 2012, Phoronix wrote an analysis of ReFS vs Btrfs. At the time, their features were similar, with both supporting checksums, RAID-like use of multiple disks, and error correction. However, ReFS lacked copy-on-write snapshots and compression, both found in Btrfs and ZFS.

In 2014, BetaNews wrote a review of ReFS and assessed its readiness for production use. The review concluded that ReFS had at least some advantages over two file systems then available for file servers running Unix-like operating systems, ZFS and ReiserFS.

ZFS (used in Solaris, illumos, FreeBSD and others) was widely criticized for its comparatively extreme memory requirements of many gigabytes of RAM for online deduplication. However, online deduplication was not enabled by default in ZFS and was not supported at the time by ReFS (it has since been added), so not enabling ZFS online deduplication yielded a more even comparison between the two file systems as ZFS then has a memory requirement of only a few hundred megabytes.

== Reverse engineering and internals ==
As of November 2019, Microsoft has not published any specifications for ReFS. An open source read-only FUSE / Linux kernel driver is under active development and a third-party open-source project to document ReFS is on GitHub.

Paragon Software Group provides a closed-source driver for Windows and Linux.

Some other Open Specifications mention ReFS specifics and allow for some information about the platform specific behaviour to be drawn from:

- [MS-FSA] Appendix A: Product Behavior - Covers Windows specific platform limitations and implementation details for ReFS, NTFS, FAT, EXFAT, UDFS, CDFS
- [MS-FSCC] Appendix B: Product Behavior - Describes various ReFS internals, e.g. how its 64-bit and 128-bit file ids are generated
- Windows Internals, Part 2, 7th Edition - Microsoft has also released a book containing more internals (which is also sometimes referenced within some of the specifications using "[WININTERNALS]", there even though it was released in two parts it is referred to as a single thing with the chapter number continuing from the first part. The filesystem specific part containing information about ReFS is within part 2. ISBN Part 1: 978-0-7356-8418-8 and ISBN Part 2: 978-0-13-546240-9

== See also ==
- Comparison of file systems
- Apple File System
- WinFS
