= Ntfsprogs =

Free Unix utilities for managing the NTFS file system

ntfsprogs
- Final release: 2.0.0 / September 29, 2007
- Written in: C
- Operating system: Unix-like
- Successor: NTFS-3G
- Type: File system utilities
- License: GNU GPL
- Website: www.linux-ntfs.org/doku.php?id=ntfsprogs at the Wayback Machine (archived May 22, 2008)

Ntfsprogs was a collection of free Unix utilities for managing the NTFS file system used by the Windows NT operating system (since version 3.1) on a hard disk partition. 'ntfsprogs' was the first stable method of writing to NTFS partitions in Linux.

All NTFS versions were supported, as used by 32-bit and 64-bit Windows. ntfsprogs was a popular way of interacting with NTFS partitions and was included by most Linux distributions and on Live CDs. There are also versions that have been compiled for Windows.

On April 12, 2011 Tuxera announced that Ntfsprogs project was merged into NTFS-3G.

== See also ==
- e2fsprogs
- reiserfsprogs
- Tuxera
