= MOTW =

MOTW or MotW may refer to:

- Mark of the Wolves, a 1999 fighting game
- Maudlin of the Well, an American metal band
- Memory of the World Programme, a UNESCO initiative
- Men of the World, a British situation comedy
- Monster of the Week, a tabletop role-playing game
- Monster of the week, a one-use antagonist in episodic fiction
- Movie of the week, a television film
- Music of the World, a record label
- Mark of the Web, identifying potentially dangerous computer files
- "MOTW", a song by Gunna from the album Wunna
