= Convert (command) =

convert
- Developer: Microsoft
- Initial release: February 17, 2000; 26 years ago
- Operating system: Microsoft Windows
- Type: Command
- License: Proprietary commercial software
- Website: docs.microsoft.com/en-us/windows-server/administration/windows-commands/convert

In computing, convert is a command-line utility included in the Windows NT operating system line. It is used to convert volumes using the FAT file systems to NTFS.

== Overview ==
convert is an external command first introduced with Windows 2000. If the drive cannot be locked (for example, the drive is the system volume or the current drive) the command gives the option to convert the drive the next time the computer is restarted. The conversion can not be reversed in-place, which means going back to the old file system requires writing the files again.

On Unix-like systems, there are similar tools like convertfs, a utility which performs in-place conversion between any two file systems with sparse file support and btrfs-convert, a tool that can convert from ext2/ext3/ext4 or reiserFS file system to Btrfs in-place.

== Syntax ==
The command-syntax is:

convert volume /FS:NTFS [/V]

== Example ==
The following command converts the volume on drive D: to NTFS. The /v command-line option will cause it to display all messages during the conversion process.

C:\>convert d: /fs:ntfs /v
