= Tuxera =

Finnish software company

Tuxera Inc.

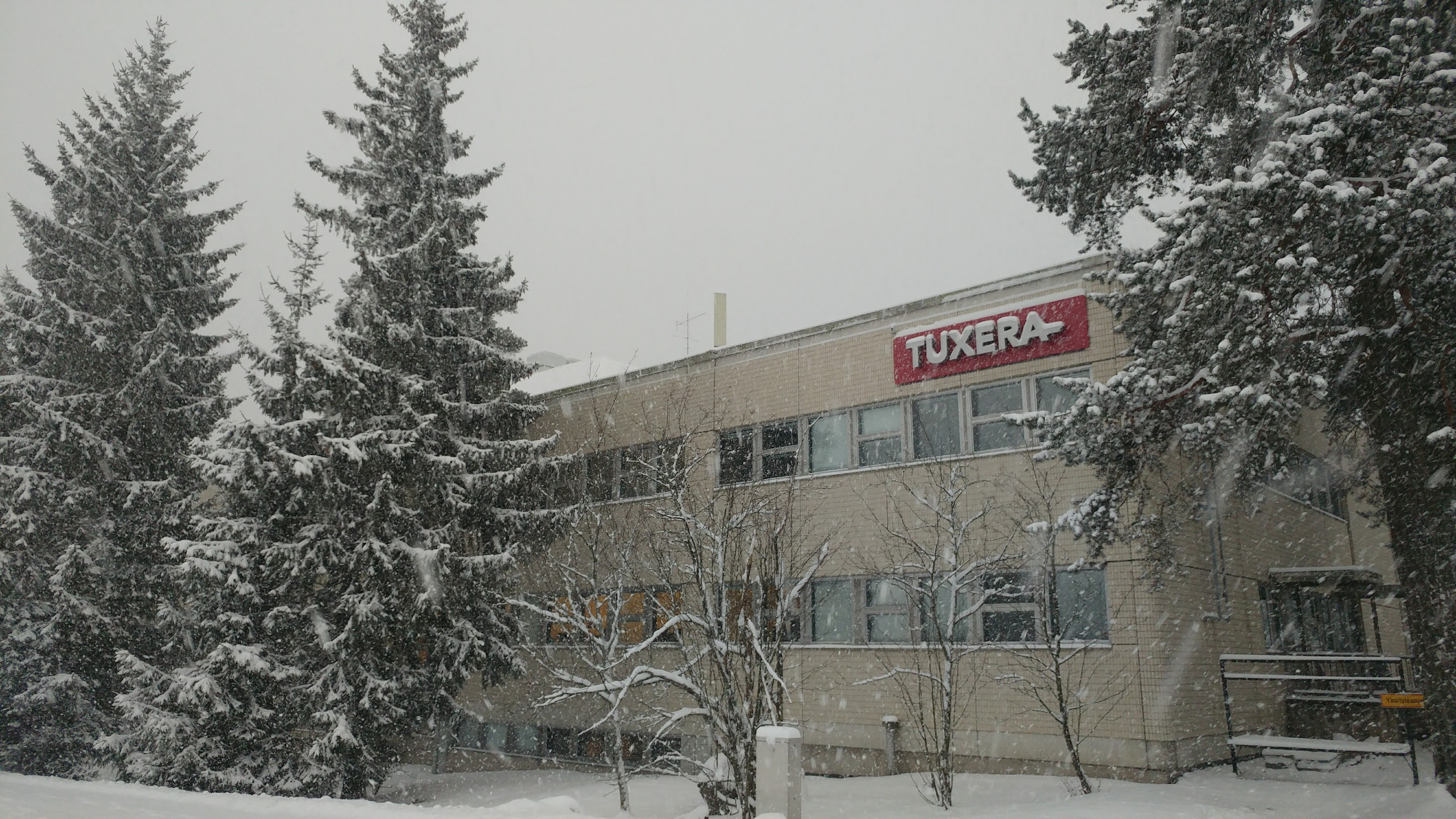
- Type: Private
- Industry: Middleware, embedded systems, enterprise storage
- Founded: Finland (2008)
- Headquarters: Espoo, Finland
- Key people: Steffan Schumacher, CEO
- Website: www.tuxera.com

Tuxera Inc. (natively Tuxera Oy) is a Finnish company that develops and sells file systems, flash management and networking software. The company was founded in 2008 and is headquartered in Espoo, Finland. Tuxera's other offices are located in the US, UK, South Korea, Japan, Hungary, Germany, Taiwan and China.

The company focuses on data management software for embedded systems: industry-standard file system technologies (APFS, exFAT, FAT, HFS+, NTFS), other embedded proprietary file systems, flash translation layer software, networking stacks and crypto library for embedded systems. Tuxera has network file sharing solutions that support enterprise storage use cases as well.

== History ==
The origin of the company dates back to the development of open-source NTFS in the late 1990s. NTFS had been introduced in 1993 by Microsoft as the file system for Windows NT. At that time Anton Altaparmakov emerged as the lead developer and maintainer of the Linux NTFS kernel driver. Meanwhile, Szabolcs Szakacsits continued to lead a platform-independent project under the name NTFS-3G. In 2006, NTFS-3G became the first driver to gain full read and write support. Commercial activity started in 2007 and the company was founded next year. In 2009 the company signed agreements with Microsoft, which was followed by global expansion and establishing collaboration with chipset vendors and software platform companies.

After several years of contributions to the Linux kernel, Tuxera joined the Linux Foundation in 2011.

In 2014 the Enterprise division was created to build SMB (Server Message Block) file sharing, and Tuxera SMB was created. In 2016 an official partnership with Microsoft was formed, and the product was launched and later became Fusion File Share by Tuxera.

In 2019, the company became a board member of the SD Association. Tuxera also acquired Datalight that year, adding more file systems and flash management software to their offering. Later in 2021, Tuxera acquired HCC Embedded, expanding to networking, cryptographic and storage solutions for deeply embedded environments in real-time operating systems and micro-controllers.

In 2025, Fusion File Share was rebranded as Fusion SMB and is now part of the Tuxera Fusion platform, to be joined by Fusion NFS (Network File System) in November 2026. Utilized by major companies in aerospace, media, medical, research, alongside oil and gas, Fusion continues to deliver world-leading file-sharing solutions for Linux-based storage systems.

== Embedded software products ==
=== Tuxera NitroFS (formerly Reliance Nitro) ===
Tuxera NitroFS is a proprietary, file system designed to protect both metadata and user data against corruption, including during unexpected power interruptions. It uses a copy‑on‑write architecture with transaction points to ensure data consistency and controlled write behavior. NitroFS is intended for embedded and safety‑critical systems where reliable data storage is required under demanding conditions.

=== Tuxera EdgeFS (formerly Reliance Edge) ===
Tuxera EdgeFS is an embedded file system designed for resource‑constrained and safety‑critical environments. It features a small code footprint and is intended for systems that require predictable behavior and suitability for certification. EdgeFS is used in embedded devices where robustness and efficient use of system resources are essential.

=== Microsoft NTFS by Tuxera (formerly Tuxera NTFS) ===
Tuxera develops a commercial-grade NTFS file system driver, primarily for OEMs and other device manufacturers. It's deployed in car IVIs, smart TVs, set-top boxes, smartphones, tablets, routers, NAS and other devices. It is available for Android and other Linux platforms, QNX, WinCE Series 40, VxWorks and any RTOS variant. Supported architectures are any 32-bit or 64-bit microcontroller, even bare metal.

=== Microsoft exFAT by Tuxera (formerly Tuxera exFAT) ===
Microsoft exFAT by Tuxera is a licensed exFAT file system driver for removable storage, such as USB drives and SD memory cards, used in embedded and device environments. In 2009, Tuxera signed an intellectual property agreement with Microsoft, becoming the first independent software vendor to receive access to the exFAT specifications, source code, and verification tools from Microsoft. Tuxera was the first independent vendor to receive legal access to exFAT and TexFAT specifications, source code and verification tools from Microsoft. The driver is used in a range of devices and systems, including automotive infotainment systems and other embedded platforms that rely on removable storage.

=== Microsoft FAT by Tuxera (formerly Tuxera FAT) ===
Microsoft FAT by Tuxera is a licensed FAT® file system driver for embedded devices and removable storage media, providing interoperable FAT support across a wide range of storage technologies. The software is used by chipset and hardware manufacturers, as well as software and system integrators, to implement FAT‑compatible storage.

=== NTFS-3G ===
NTFS‑3G is an open‑source (“community edition”) NTFS file system driver that has been widely used in Linux distributions, including Fedora, Ubuntu, and others. On April 12, 2011 it was announced that Ntfsprogs project was merged with NTFS-3G.

== Flash memory software controllers ==
=== Tuxera FlashFX Tera ===
Tuxera FlashFX Tera is a software flash memory controller designed to manage raw flash media in embedded systems. It provides functions such as wear leveling, bad block management, and data integrity protection to extend flash memory lifetime and reliability. FlashFX Tera is typically used together with embedded file systems in mission-critical applications that rely on raw flash storage.

== Embedded networking and security ==
=== Tuxera TCP/IP Stack ===
Embedded networking and security products from Tuxera provide networking capabilities for embedded systems with constrained resources.The portfolio includes TCP/IP and TCP/IP CERT stacks, where latter is developed specifically for functional safety requirements. The portfolio has been developed to meet the requirements of the deeply embedded environments, whole portfolio also follows MISRA-C coding standard. Tuxera offers CryptoCore cryptographic library for encryption, key-agreement and hashing. Originally developed to be used with Tuxera's own security protocols in the TCP/IP stack but algorithms can be integrated to third party stacks. CryptoCore is also developed following MISRA-C coding standard.

== Enterprise products ==
=== Tuxera Fusion Platform ===
Tuxera Fusion, first released in 2016, is an enterprise-grade file sharing platform engineered to eliminate the performance bottlenecks that hold back data-intensive workloads in HPC, AI/ML, media production, and medical research and education. Built on a proven multithreaded architecture, and a flexible foundational core, delivering capabilities conventional implementations simply cannot match. RDMA support, scale-out active-active clustering, and cluster rolling upgrades are available, enabling near-linear performance growth and zero-downtime maintenance as environments scale. Multi-protocol support with shared ACL management, lock and handle awareness, and unified access across Windows, Linux, and macOS means workflow is never restricted by protocol. Underpinning all of this is a shared reliability framework that includes transparent failover, continuous availability, persistent handles, VSS support, AES-256 encryption, and integration with Active Directory, LDAP, and distributed cluster file systems. Supported file systems include GPFS, Lustre, CephFS, GlusterFS, WekaFS, GFS2, OCFS2.

=== Tuxera Fusion SMB ===
FusionSMB is an enterprise SMB server for Linux designed to allow storage manufacturers, cloud providers, and enterprises to move large amounts of data quickly across platforms. SMB Direct via RDMA delivers up to 11.5 GB/s per 100GbE connection on Windows, scaling linearly — 24 GB/s with two connections, 48 GB/s with four. macOS clients see up to 10.5 GB/s using a single 100GbE connection, with lab figures reaching 250 GB/s to a single workstation. Fusion SMB supports SMB multichannel, SMB compression, and SMB over QUIC. It scales from minimal-footprint containers running Docker and Kubernetes to 32-node scale-out clusters.

=== Tuxera FusionNFS ===
FusionNFS is engineered from the ground up to run in user mode, meaning it operates outside the kernel itself enabling containerised deployment, greater flexibility, and security that kernel-mode implementations cannot guarantee. FusionNFS achieves up to 22.7 GB/s over a single 200GbE connection, which is faster than NFSD running in kernel mode and more than double the throughput of Ganesha, making it the fastest user-mode NFS server available for Linux. Its scale-out capability uses active-active clustering to let multiple Linux server nodes serve the same NFS shares concurrently, load-balancing clients across the cluster with near-linear performance growth, low CPU and memory overhead, and no performance penalty from clustering itself. FusionNFS is particularly well-suited to rendering, VFX, image scanning, and AI/ML workloads.

== Former and consumer products ==
=== ROM‑DOS and SOCKETS (Former / legacy) ===
ROM‑DOS is an MS‑DOS‑compatible operating system developed for embedded systems and legacy hardware environments. It enables compatibility with existing DOS‑based applications and supports deployments where long‑term hardware or software continuity is required. SOCKETS extends ROM‑DOS with networking capabilities, allowing embedded systems based on ROM‑DOS to support internet connectivity.

=== AllConnect (discontinued) ===
AllConnect was a mobile app for streaming music, photos and videos from Android and iOS devices to DLNA receivers (smart TVs, set-top-boxes, wireless speakers, etc.). It was launched on November 12, 2013 under the name of Streambels. As of April, 2020, Tuxera discontinued development of the AllConnect technology and removed the Android and iOS apps from their respective stores.

=== Microsoft NTFS for Mac by Tuxera (formerly Tuxera NTFS for Mac) ===
NTFS for Mac by Tuxera allows macOS systems to read from and write to NTFS‑formatted storage volumes. By default, macOS provides only limited support for NTFS file systems. The software is bundled with Tuxera Disk Manager to facilitate formatting and maintenance of NTFS volumes on macOS and supports use in virtualized environments such as Parallels Desktop and VMware Fusion.

=== SD Memory Card Formatter ===
Tuxera, in association with SD Association, developed the official formatting application for Secure Digital memory cards, which is available as a free download for Windows, Linux and macOS.
