= ExFAT =

Flash file system

exFAT
- Developer: Microsoft
- Full name: Extensible File Allocation Table
- Introduced: November 2006; 20 years ago with Windows Embedded CE 6.0
- Partition IDs: MBR/EBR: 0x07 (same as for HPFS/NTFS); BDP/GPT: EBD0A0A2-B9E5-4433-87C0-68B6B72699C7

Structures
- Directory contents: Table
- File allocation: Bitmap, linked list
- Bad blocks: Cluster tagging

Limits
- Max volume size: 128 PB, 512 TB recommended (Note: The theoretical maximum volume size is defined by up to 2^{32} − 11 possible clusters with up to 2^{25} bytes per cluster ≈ 128 PB. The cluster count is limited to 32-bit integers. The cluster size is not limited by data type; it's probably set in consideration of the LBA48 addressing scheme, as with a 512-byte sector size, only 2^{48} × 512 = 2^{57} bytes = 128 PB can be addressed.)
- Max file size: 128 PB (Note: Although Microsoft published a different value in KB955704, the file size is in bytes and is stored as a 64-bit number. The largest theoretical file size would be 16 EB − 1 byte, the same as in NTFS. However, since the maximum volume size under the current specification cannot exceed ~128 PB, a file can never reach that file length.)
- Max no. of files: Up to 2,796,202 per directory
- Max filename length: 255 characters
- Allowed filename characters: All Unicode characters except: U+0000 (NUL) to U+001F (US); / (slash); \ (backslash); : (colon); * (asterisk); ? (question mark); " (quote); < (less than); > (greater than); | (pipe); (Uses UTF-16LE)

Features
- Dates recorded: Creation, last modified, last access
- Date range: 1980-01-01 to 2107-12-31
- Date resolution: 10 ms for last modified time; 10 ms for creation time; 2 s for access date
- Forks: No
- Attributes: Read-only, hidden, system, subdirectory, archive
- File system permissions: Windows CE 6 only (ACL)
- Transparent compression: No
- Transparent encryption: Yes (EFS), starting with Windows 10 v1607 and Windows Server 2016

Other
- Supported operating systems: Windows Embedded CE 6.0; Windows XP SP2 and later; Windows Server 2003 SP2 and later; Linux distros with either Linux kernel v5.4+ or FUSE; FreeBSD with FUSE; Mac OS X 10.6 and later; Android 13 and some devices running previous versions; iOS 13.1 and later; ChromeOS

exFAT (Extensible File Allocation Table) is a file system optimized for flash memory such as USB flash drives and SD cards, that was introduced by Microsoft in 2006. exFAT was proprietary until 28 August 2019, when Microsoft published its specification. Microsoft owns patents on several elements of its design.

exFAT can be used where NTFS is not a feasible solution (due to data-structure overhead), but where a greater file-size limit than that of the standard FAT32 file system (i.e. 4 GB) is required.

exFAT has been adopted by the SD Association as the default file system for SDXC and SDUC cards larger than 32 GB.

== History ==
exFAT was introduced in late 2006 as part of Windows CE 6.0, an embedded Windows operating system. Support was added to regular Windows with Windows Vista Service Pack 1 and Windows Server 2008, both released on February 4, 2008. An update for Windows XP and Windows Server 2003 was later released.

Most of the vendors signing on for licenses are manufacturers of embedded systems or device manufacturers that produce media formatted with exFAT. The entire File Allocation Table (FAT) family, exFAT included, is used for embedded systems because it is lightweight and is better suited for solutions that have low memory and low power requirements, and can be easily implemented in firmware.

== Features ==
Because file size references are stored in eight instead of four bytes, the file size limit has increased to 16 exabytes (EB) (2^{64} − 1 bytes, or about 10^{19} bytes, which is otherwise limited by a maximum volume size of 128 PB, or 2^{57} − 1 bytes), raised from 4 GB (2^{32} − 1 bytes) in a standard FAT32 file system. Therefore, for the typical user, this enables seamless interoperability between Windows, Linux and macOS platforms for files in excess of 4 GB.

Other specifications, features, and requirements of the exFAT file system include:

- Scalability to large disk sizes: about 128 PB (2^{57} − 1 bytes) maximum, 512 TB (2^{49} − 1 bytes) recommended maximum, raised from the 32-bit limit (2 TB for a sector size of 512 bytes) of standard FAT32 partitions.
- Support for up to 2,796,202 files per directory. (Note: This limit applies because the maximum directory size is 256 MB.) Microsoft documents a limit of 65,534 (2^{16} − 2) files per sub-directory for their FAT32 implementation, but other operating systems have no special limit for the number of files in a FAT32 directory. FAT32 implementations in other operating systems allow an unlimited number of files up to the number of available clusters (that is, up to 268,304,373 files on volumes without long filenames). (Note: 268,304,373 files = 2^{28} − 11 reserved clusters − 131,072, the minimum number of 64 KB clusters occupied for the 268,435,445 directory entries (32 bytes) without VFAT LFNs, which are required for 268,435,445 files with sizes between 1 and 65,535 bytes. With VFATs, the 131,072 number must be multiplied by 21 (worst case), which would result in 265,682,933 files instead.)
- Maximum number of files on volume C, to 4,294,967,285 (2^{32} − 11, up from about 2^{28} − 11 in standard FAT32).
- Free space allocation and delete performance improved due to introduction of a free-space bitmap.
- Timestamp granularity of 10 ms for creation and modified times (down from 2 s on FAT, but not as fine as NTFS's 100 ns).
- Timestamp granularity for last-access time to double seconds (FAT had date only).
- Timestamps come with a time zone marker in offset relative to UTC (starting with Vista SP2).
- Optional support for access-control lists (not currently supported in Windows Desktop/Server versions).
- Optional support for TexFAT, a transactional file system standard (optionally WinCE activated function, not supported in Windows Desktop/Server versions).
- Boundary alignment offset for the FAT table.
- Boundary alignment offset for the data region.
- Provision for OEM-definable parameters to customize the file system for specific device characteristics.
- Valid data length (VDL): through the use of two distinct lengths fields – one for "allocated space" and the other for "valid data" – exFAT can preallocate a file without leaking data that was previously on-disk.
- Cluster size up to 32 MB.
- Metadata integrity with checksums.
- Template-based metadata structures.
- Removal of the physical . and .. directory entries that appear in subdirectories.
- exFAT no longer stores the short 8.3 filename references in directory structure and natively uses extended file names, whereas legacy FAT versions implement extended file names through the VFAT extension.

Windows XP requires update KB955704 to be installed, and Windows Vista requires its SP1 installed. Windows Vista is unable to use exFAT drives for ReadyBoost. Windows 7 removes this limitation, enabling ReadyBoost caches larger than 4 GB. Windows 10 only allows formatting exFAT and NTFS on non-removeable volumes sized larger than 32 GB with the default user interface, and FAT32 format is suggested for smaller volumes; command-line utilities don't accept quick format using FAT32 if volume is larger than 32 GB.

The standard exFAT implementation is not journaled and only uses a single file allocation table and free-space map. FAT file systems instead used alternating tables, as this allowed recovery of the file system if the media was ejected during a write (which occurs frequently in practice with removable media). The optional TexFAT component adds support for additional backup tables and maps, but may not be supported.

The exFAT format allows individual files larger than 4 GB, facilitating long continuous recording of HD video, which can exceed the 4 GB limit in less than an hour. Digital cameras using FAT32 will break the video files into multiple segments of approximately 2 or 4 GB.

EFS supported in Windows 10 v1607 and Windows Server 2016 or later.

=== Efficiency ===
SDXC cards running at UHS-I have a minimum guaranteed write speed of 10 MB/s, and exFAT plays a factor in achieving this throughput through the reduction of the file-system overhead in cluster allocation. This is achieved through the introduction of a separate cluster bitmap where the reservation state of each cluster (reserved/free) is tracked by only one bit, reducing writes to the much larger FAT that originally served this purpose.

Additionally, a single bit in the directory record indicates that the file is contiguous (unfragmented), telling the exFAT driver to ignore the FAT. This optimization is analogous to an extent in other file systems, except that it only applies to whole files, as opposed to contiguous parts of files.

== Adoption ==
exFAT is supported in Windows XP and Windows Server 2003 with update KB955704, Windows Vista Service Pack 1 and later, Windows Server 2008 and later (except Server Core), macOS starting from 10.6.5, Linux via FUSE or natively starting from kernel 5.4, and iPadOS as well as iOS starting from 13.1.

Companies can integrate exFAT into a specific group of consumer devices, including cameras, camcorders, and digital photo frames for a flat fee. Mobile phones, PCs, and networks have a different volume pricing model.

exFAT is supported in a number of media devices such as modern flat-panel TVs, media centers, and portable media players.

exFAT is the official file system of SDXC cards. Because of this, any device not supporting exFAT, such as the Nintendo 3DS, may not legally advertise itself as SDXC compatible, despite supporting SDXC cards as mass storage devices by formatting the card with FAT32 or a proprietary file system tied to the device in question.

Some vendors of other flash media, including USB pen drives, compact flash (CF) and solid-state drives (SSD) ship some of their high-capacity media pre-formatted with the exFAT file system to ensure compatibility with any given device. For example, Sandisk ships their 256 GB CF cards as exFAT.

Microsoft has entered into licensing agreements with BlackBerry, Panasonic, Sanyo, Sony, Canon, Aspen Avionics, Audiovox, Continental, Harman, LG Automotive and BMW.

Mac OS X Snow Leopard 10.6.5 and later can create, read, write, verify, and repair exFAT file systems.

Linux has support for exFAT via FUSE since 2009. In 2013, Samsung Electronics published a Linux driver for exFAT under GPL. On 28 August 2019, Microsoft published the exFAT specification and released the patent to the Open Invention Network (OIN) members. The Linux kernel introduced native exFAT support with the 5.4 release in November 2019.

ChromeOS can read and write to exFAT partitions.

OpenHarmony operating system since 3.1 version in December 2021, alongside HarmonyOS platform with HarmonyOS NEXT Beta update add native support for read and write exFAT partitions.

== Technical specifications ==
Default exFAT cluster sizes in Windows
Volume size		Cluster size	Cluster count (Note: Actual maximums are 1, or 1 cluster, less than given.)
Min	Max	Cluster size	Cluster count
7 MB	256 MB	4 KB	65,536 (2^{16})
256 MB	32 GB	32 KB	1,048,576 (2^{20})
32 GB	512 GB (Note: Windows 8/10 defaults to exFAT on volumes sized ≥32 GB, and FAT32 on volumes 32 GB.) (Note: Windows XP/Vista/7 defaults to 128 KB clusters for volumes sized ≥32 GB.)	128 KB	4,194,304 (2^{18})
512 GB	1 TB	256 KB	4,194,304 (2^{18})
1 TB	2 TB	512 KB	4,194,304 (2^{18})
2 TB	4 TB	1 MB	4,194,304 (2^{18})
4 TB	8 TB	2 MB	4,194,304 (2^{18})
8 TB	16 TB	4 MB	4,194,304 (2^{18})
16 TB	32 TB	8 MB	4,194,304 (2^{18})
32 TB	64 TB	16 MB	4,194,304 (2^{18})
64 TB	512 TB	32 MB	16,777,216 (2^{24})

=== File name lookup ===
exFAT employs a filename hash-based lookup phase to speed certain cases, which is described in US patent Quick File Name Lookup Using Name Hash. Appendix A of the document contains details helpful in understanding the file system.

=== File and cluster pre-allocation ===
Like NTFS, exFAT can pre-allocate disk space for a file by just marking arbitrary space on disk as "allocated". For each file, exFAT uses two separate 64-bit fields in the directory: the valid data length (VDL), which indicates the real size of the file, and the physical data length.

To provide improvement in the allocation of cluster storage for a new file, Microsoft incorporated a method to pre-allocate contiguous clusters and bypass the use of updating the FAT table, which was patented December 10, 2013. One feature of exFAT (used in the exFAT implementation within embedded systems) provides atomic transactions for the multiple steps of updating the file-system metadata. The feature called Transaction Safe FAT, or TexFAT, was granted a patent on November 3, 2009.

=== Directory file set ===
exFAT and the rest of the FAT family of file systems do not use indexes for file names, unlike NTFS, which uses B-trees for file searching. When a file is accessed, the directory must be sequentially searched until a match is found. For file names shorter than 16 characters in length, one file name record is required but the entire file is represented by three 32-byte directory records. This is called a directory file set, and a 256 MB sub-directory can hold up to 2,796,202 file sets. (If files have longer names, this number will decrease, but this is the maximum based on the minimal three-record file set.) To help improve the sequential searching of the directories (including the root) a hash value of the file name is derived for each file and stored in the directory record. When searching for a file, the file name is first converted to upper case using the upcase table (file names are case-insensitive) and then hashed using a proprietary patented algorithm into a 16-bit (2-byte) hash value. Each record in the directory is searched by comparing the hash value. When a match is found, the file names are compared to ensure that the proper file was located in case of hash collisions. This improves performance because only 2 bytes have to be compared for each file. This significantly reduces the CPU load because most file names are more than 2 characters (bytes) in size and virtually every comparison is performed on only 2 bytes at a time until the intended file is located.

=== Metadata and checksums ===
exFAT introduces metadata integrity through the use of checksums. There are three checksums currently in use.

1. The volume boot record (VBR) is a 12-sector region that contains the boot records, BIOS parameter block (BPB), OEM parameters and the checksum sector. (There are two VBR type regions, the main VBR and the backup VBR.) The checksum sector is a checksum of the previous 11 sectors, with the exception of three bytes in the boot sector (flags and percent used). This provides integrity of the VBR by determining whether the VBR was modified. The most common cause could be a boot-sector virus, but this would also catch any other corruption to the VBR.
2. A second checksum is used for the upcase table. This is a static table and should never change. Any corruption in the table could prevent files from being located because this table is used to convert the filenames to upper case when searching to locate a file.
3. The third checksum is in the directory file sets. Multiple directory records are used to define a single file, and this is called a file set. This file set has metadata including the file name, time stamps, attributes, address of first cluster location of the data, file lengths, and the file name. A checksum is taken over the entire file set, and a mismatch would occur if the directory file set was accidentally or maliciously changed.

When the file system is mounted, and the integrity check is conducted, these hashes are verified. Mounting also includes comparison of the version of the exFAT file system by the driver to make sure the driver is compatible with the file system it is trying to mount, and to make sure that none of the required directory records are missing (for example, the directory record for the upcase table and allocation bitmap are required, and the file system can't run if they are missing). If any of these checks fail, the file system should not be mounted, although in certain cases it may mount read-only.

The file system provides extensibility through template-based metadata definitions using generic layouts and generic patterns.

=== Flash optimizations ===
exFAT contains features that, according to Microsoft, make it flash-friendly:

- Boundary alignment for filesystem structures. The offsets for the FAT and the cluster heap is adjustable at format time, so that writes to these areas will happen in as few flash blocks as possible.
- An "OEM parameters" field can be used to record features such as block size of the underlying storage. One single type for flash storage is pre-defined.
- The lack of a journal, so that less data is written. (Although FAT32 also lacks a journal.)

The first feature requires support from the formatting software. Compliant implementations will follow existing offsets. The OEM parameter may be ignored. Implementations may also use TRIM to reduce wear.

Flash device features in exFAT implementations
	Boundary alignment (format)	OEM parameters (use)	TRIM (use)	Note
Windows CE	Yes	Yes	Unknown	
Windows Desktop and Server	Yes	Yes	No	
Linux kernel	since 5.7	ignored	since 5.13	exfatprogs is assumed to be used for formatting.

== Other implementations ==
=== Legal status ===
exFAT was a proprietary file system until 2019, when Microsoft released the specification and allowed OIN members to use their patents. This lack of documentation along with the threat of a patent infringement lawsuit, as happened previously when Microsoft sued various companies over the VFAT long file name patent (before it expired), hampered the development of free and open-source drivers for exFAT, and led to a situation where Linux distributions could not even tell users how to get an exFAT driver. Accordingly, exFAT official support was effectively limited to Microsoft's own products and those of Microsoft's licensees. This, in turn, inhibited exFAT's adoption as a universal exchange format, as it was safer and easier for vendors to rely on FAT32 than it was to pay Microsoft or risk being sued.

Interoperability requires that certain results be achieved in a particular, predefined way (an algorithm). For exFAT, this potentially requires every implementation to perform certain procedures in exactly the same way as Microsoft's implementation. Some of the procedures used by Microsoft's implementation are patented, and these patents are owned by Microsoft. A license to use these algorithms can be purchased from Microsoft, and some companies – including Apple, Google and Samsung – have done so. However, in the open-source ecosystem, users have typically responded to vendors being unwilling to pay for patent licenses by procuring an implementation for themselves from unofficial sources. For example, this is what happened with LAME when MP3 patents were still valid. (Alternatively, the user may decide that the feature is unimportant to them.)

Regardless of whether open-source or not, Microsoft stated that "a license is required in order to implement exFAT and use it in a product or device". Unlicensed distribution of an exFAT driver would make the distributor liable for financial damages if the driver is found to have violated Microsoft's patents. While the patents may not be enforceable, this can only be determined through a legal process, which is expensive and time-consuming. It may also be possible to achieve the intended results without infringing Microsoft's patents. In October 2018, Microsoft released 60,000 patents to the OIN members for Linux systems, but exFAT patents were not initially included at the time. There was, however, discussion within Microsoft over whether Microsoft should allow exFAT in Linux devices, which eventually resulted in Microsoft publishing the official specification for open usage and releasing the exFAT patents to the OIN in August 2019.

=== List of implementations ===
A FUSE-based implementation named fuse-exfat, or exfat-fuse, with read/write support is available for FreeBSD, multiple Linux distributions, and older versions of Mac OS X. It supports TRIM. An implementation called exFATFileSystem, based on fuse-exfat, is available for AmigaOS 4.1.

A Linux kernel implementation by Samsung Electronics is available. It was initially released on GitHub unintentionally, and later released officially by Samsung in compliance with the GPLv2 in 2013. (This release does not make exFAT royalty-free, as licensing from Samsung does not remove Microsoft's patent rights.) A version of this driver was first incorporated into version 5.4 of the Linux kernel. A much newer version of the driver, with several bug fixes and improved reliability, was incorporated into kernel 5.7. Prior to its being merged into the Linux kernel, this newer version had already seen adoption on Android smartphones and continued to be used on both Linux and Android thereafter.

Proprietary read/write solutions licensed and derived from the Microsoft exFAT implementation are available for Android, Linux, and other operating systems from Paragon Software Group and Tuxera.

XCFiles (from Datalight) is a proprietary, full-featured implementation, intended to be portable to 32-bit systems. Rtfs (from EBS Embedded Software) is a full-featured implementation for embedded devices.

Two experimental, unofficial solutions are available for DOS. The loadable USBEXFAT driver requires Panasonic's USB stack for DOS and only works with USB storage devices; the open-source EXFAT executable is an exFAT file-system reader and requires the HX DOS extender to work. There are no native exFAT real-mode DOS drivers, which would allow usage of, or booting from, exFAT volumes.

The renaming of exFAT file system labels is natively supported by Microsoft Windows Explorer, while Linux relies on the exfatlabel and tune.exfat tools (both part of exfatprogs).

== See also ==
- Design of the FAT file system
- List of file systems
- Comparison of file systems
- Memory Stick XC
- Universal Disk Format
