= Tom Miller (computer programmer) =

American computer programmer (born 1950)

Tom Miller (born 1950) is a software developer who was employed by Microsoft.

Miller worked as a member of the original team of developers who followed Dave Cutler from DEC to Microsoft, where he initially started working in the networking group.

After less than two years, Miller moved to the Windows NT team, where he worked with John Nelson on file systems and wrote the original 50 page specification document for the NT File System.
