= Mark of the Web =

Identifier for files sourced from the Internet

The Mark of the Web (MoTW) is a metadata identifier used by Microsoft Windows to mark files downloaded from the Internet as potentially unsafe. Although its name specifically references the Web, it is also sometimes added to files from other sources perceived to be of high risk, including files copied from NTFS-formatted external drives that were themselves downloaded from the web at some earlier point.

It is implemented using the alternate data stream (ADS) feature of Microsoft's default NTFS filesystem. Due to its reliance on features exclusive to NTFS, transferring the file to or from a partition with an alternative filesystem, such as FAT32 or Ext4, will strip the file of its ADSs and thus the mark. These alternate streams are intended to be transparent (i.e. hidden from most users) and are not shown to or made editable by users through any GUI built into Windows by default.

A second type of MotW can arise when saving a webpage as an HTML document, as most browsers will insert an HTML comment in the process while noting the URL from which the document was saved. This form of mark is significantly different in that it is clearly accessible to users and is embedded within the file itself, rather than the ADS metadata, making it easy to manually spot and remove.

The mark was added by all versions of Internet Explorer supported by Windows 7 and later. All Chromium (e.g. Google Chrome) and Firefox-based web browsers also write the mark's stream to downloaded files. All of these browsers additionally add the second type of mark in the form of the source URL of downloaded webpages as a HTML comment at the beginning of the file. Chromium and Firefox-based browser marks contain the domain name and exact URL of the original online download location, potentially offering a method of tracking browsing history with concomitant privacy risks.

== Effects ==
Windows warns users attempting to open a Web-marked file that it was downloaded from the Internet and could be harmful; the user can opt either to continue or cancel execution. If the file is executable and the user opts to override the warning, the mark will be removed from the file in order to prevent the same prompting each time. Unless overridden by user action, the mark prevents macros from running in Microsoft Office files. Visual Studio projects created with Web-marked files cannot be built or executed.

Some archiving software propagates the MoTW from the archive itself to files extracted from it, preventing its security protection being bypassed by malware distributed within an archive.

If the downloaded file is an executable (e.g. an installer), the mark stream can be used for reflection, enabling the program to identify from where it was downloaded, which is occasionally used for telemetry and/or security purposes. A program can attempt to verify that it was downloaded from an official source (assuming the stream has not been removed or spoofed) and can transmit this information back over the internet (an example of this in action is BiglyBT's installer).

== Implementation ==
ADS is a form of fork allowing more than one data stream to be associated with a filename using the format filename:streamname.

In the case of the mark, the ADS is named Zone.Identifier. As of Windows 10, the contents of the Zone.Identifier stream are structured like an INI file (i.e. a key-value store) that includes the keys HostIpAddress, HostUrl, and ReferrerUrl. To some extent, these are implementation-defined fields, but they typically contain the domain name and exact URL of the original online download location.

== Security concerns ==
The National Vulnerability Database has listed four security vulnerabilities related to the mark of the web, all of which have been patched:

- CVE-2022-41091 (November 8, 2022) – malicious actors could avoid files downloaded from the Internet being marked
- CVE-2022-44698 (December 13, 2022) and (CVE-2023-36584, October 10, 2023) – malicious actors could bypass the restrictions of the mark without removing it
- CVE-2024-38217 (September 2024) – the malicious actors could remove the mark

An attacker may also use social engineering to convince a target user to unblock the file by right-clicking it and changing the file properties.

== On other platforms ==
macOS 10.5 introduced a similar feature, the quarantine attribute, which is applied to files downloaded from the Internet.
