= Caverphone =

Phonetic matching algorithm

The Caverphone within linguistics and computing, is a phonetic matching algorithm invented to identify English names with their sounds, originally built to process a custom dataset compound between 1893 and 1938 in southern Dunedin, New Zealand. Started from a similar concept as metaphone, it has been developed to accommodate and process general English since then.

== Etymology ==
The Caverphone was created by David Hood in the Caversham Project at the University of Otago in New Zealand in 2002, revised in 2004. It was created to assist in data matching between late 19th century and early 20th century electoral rolls, where the name only needed to be in a "commonly recognisable form". The algorithm was intended to apply to those names that could not easily be matched between electoral rolls, after the exact matches were removed from the pool of potential matches. The algorithm is optimised for accents present in the study area (southern part of the city of Dunedin, New Zealand).

== Procedure ==
=== Caverphone 1.0 ===
The rules of the algorithm are applied consecutively to any particular name, as a series of replacements.

The algorithm is as follows:

1. Convert to lowercase
2. Remove anything not A-Z
3. If the name starts with...
  1. cough, replace it by cou2f
  2. rough, replace it by rou2f
  3. tough, replace it by tou2f
  4. enough, replace it by enou2f
  5. gn, replace it by 2n
4. If the name ends with
  1. mb, replace it by m2
5. Replace
  1. cq with 2q
  2. ci with si
  3. ce with se
  4. cy with sy
  5. tch with 2ch
  6. c with k
  7. q with k
  8. x with k
  9. v with f
  10. dg with 2g
  11. tio with sio
  12. tia with sia
  13. d with t
  14. ph with fh
  15. b with p
  16. sh with s2
  17. z with s
  18. any initial vowel with an A
  19. all other vowels with a 3
  20. 3gh3 with 3kh3
  21. gh with 22
  22. g with k
  23. groups of the letter s with a S
  24. groups of the letter t with a T
  25. groups of the letter p with a P
  26. groups of the letter k with a K
  27. groups of the letter f with a F
  28. groups of the letter m with a M
  29. groups of the letter n with a N
  30. w3 with W3
  31. wy with Wy
  32. wh3 with Wh3
  33. why with Why
  34. w with 2
  35. any initial h with an A
  36. all other occurrences of h with a 2
  37. r3 with R3
  38. ry with Ry
  39. r with 2
  40. l3 with L3
  41. ly with Ly
  42. l with 2
  43. j with y
  44. y3 with Y3
  45. y with 2
6. remove all
  1. 2
  2. 3
7. put six 1 on the end
8. take the first six characters as the code

=== Caverphone 2.0 ===
1. Start with a word
2. Convert to lowercase
3. Remove anything not in the standard alphabet (typically a-z) (Note: This may vary if the set of letters includes characters such as æ, ā, or ø)
4. Remove final e
5. If the name starts with
  1. cough make it cou2f
  2. rough make it rou2f
  3. tough make it tou2f
  4. enough make it enou2f
  5. trough make it trou2f
  6. gn make it 2n
6. If the name ends with
  1. mb make it m2
7. Replace
  1. cq with 2q
  2. ci with si
  3. ce with se
  4. cy with sy
  5. tch with 2ch
  6. c with k
  7. q with k
  8. x with k
  9. v with f
  10. dg with 2g
  11. tio with sio
  12. tia with sia
  13. d with t
  14. ph with fh
  15. b with p
  16. sh with s2
  17. z with s
  18. an initial vowel (Note: Vowels are normally a, e, i, o, u but depending on the data might include characters such as æ, ā, or ø) with an A
  19. all other vowels with a 3
  20. j with y
  21. an initial y3 with Y3
  22. an initial y with A
  23. y with 3
  24. 3gh3 with 3kh3
  25. gh with 22
  26. g with k
  27. groups of the letter s with a S
  28. groups of the letter t with a T
  29. groups of the letter p with a P
  30. groups of the letter k with a K
  31. groups of the letter f with a F
  32. groups of the letter m with a M
  33. groups of the letter n with a N
  34. w3 with W3
  35. wh3 with Wh3
  36. if the name ends in w replace the final w with 3
  37. w with 2
  38. an initial h with an A
  39. all other occurrences of h with a 2
  40. r3 with R3
  41. if the name ends in r replace the final r with 3
  42. r with 2
  43. l3 with L3
  44. if the name ends in l replace the final l with 3
  45. l with 2
8. remove all 2s
9. if the name end in 3, replace the final 3 with A
10. remove all 3s
11. put ten 1s on the end
12. take the first ten characters as the code

== Examples ==
=== Caverphone 1.0 ===
Lee -> lee
lee -> l33
l33 -> L33
L33 -> L
L -> L111111
L111111 -> L11111

Thompson -> thompson
thompson -> th3mps3n
th3mps3n -> th3mpS3n
th3mpS3n -> Th3mpS3n
Th3mpS3n -> Th3mPS3n
Th3mPS3n -> Th3MPS3n
Th3MPS3n -> Th3MPS3N
Th3MPS3N -> T23MPS3N
T23MPS3N ->  TMPSN
TMPSN111111 -> TMPSN1

=== Caverphone 2.0 ===
Lee -> lee
lee -> le
le -> l3
l3 -> L3
L3 -> LA
LA -> LA1111111111
LA1111111111 -> LA11111111

Thompson -> thompson
thompson -> th3mps3n
th3mps3n -> th3mpS3n
th3mpS3n -> Th3mpS3n
Th3mpS3n -> Th3mPS3n
Th3mPS3n -> Th3MPS3n
Th3MPS3n -> Th3MPS3N
Th3MPS3N -> T23MPS3N
T23MPS3N ->  TMPSN
TMPSN1111111111 -> TMPSN11111

== See also ==
- Soundex
- New York State Identification and Intelligence System
- Match rating approach
- Metaphone
- Cologne phonetics
