= L. Joseph Melton III =

American physician and epidemiologist

- Citizenship: American
- Awards: Michael M. Eisenberg Professor (Mayo Foundation, 1991)
- Scientific career
- Fields: Clinical epidemiology; osteoporosis; bone density; fracture epidemiology
- Workplaces: Mayo Clinic, Rochester, Minnesota

L. Joseph Melton III is an American physician and epidemiologist known for his research on the epidemiology of osteoporosis and bone disease. Melton contributed to the development and continuation of the Rochester Epidemiology Project, one of the longest-running population-based medical records-linkage systems in the United States.

He co-authored the 1994 World Health Organization diagnostic criteria paper for osteoporosis, which established the bone density thresholds still used in clinical diagnosis. He was named the Michael M. Eisenberg Professor by the Mayo Foundation Board of Trustees.

== Early life and education ==
Melton was born on May 17, 1944 in Pensacola, Florida and raised in Baton Rouge, Louisiana. He graduated from the Louisiana State University (LSU) with a Bachelor of Science degree in 1965 and earned his Doctor of Medicine from the LSU School of Medicine in 1969. He completed a residency in Preventive Medicine at the University of Michigan, where he earned a Master of Public Health degree in 1971. Melton then served on the staff of the Surgeon General of the Navy in Washington, D.C., and received the Donald H. Gaylor Award from the Association of Military Surgeons of the United States in 1976 for modernizing the Navy's approach to tuberculosis screening. He resigned from the Navy in 1977 and joined the staff of the Mayo Clinic in Rochester, Minnesota.

== Career ==
At Mayo, Melton served as Senior Consultant and Head of the Section of Clinical epidemiology. In 1991, he was named the Michael M. Eisenberg Professor by the Mayo Foundation Board of Trustees, in recognition of his contributions to clinical epidemiology.

He played a role in the development and continuation of the Rochester Epidemiology Project (REP), a medical records-linkage system established in 1966 that captures health care information for the population of Olmsted County, Minnesota. The REP is one of the longest-running population-based research infrastructures in the United States and has supported thousands of epidemiological studies. Melton wrote the 1996 history of the project in the Mayo Clinic Proceedings, cited more than 1,500 times, and introduced a broad patient research authorization system in 1997 to address confidentiality concerns.

== Research ==
Melton used dual photon absorptiometry (DPA) to demonstrate that osteoporotic women with vertebral fractures had lost substantially more bone than controls, a contribution to modern bone density assessment. Melton was a co-author of the World Health Organization Study Group that produced the 1994 report "Assessment of fracture risk and its application to screening for postmenopausal osteoporosis," published in Osteoporosis International. This report established the bone density T-score thresholds (T-score of −2.5 or below for osteoporosis; between −1.0 and −2.5 for osteopenia) that remain the basis of clinical osteoporosis diagnosis worldwide. The paper has been cited more than 3,500 times.

In 2002, Melton co-authored with Steven R. Cummings the review "Epidemiology and outcomes of osteoporotic fractures," published in The Lancet as part of a series on osteoporosis. The paper, cited more than 5,600 times, established the widely cited estimate that approximately 1.5 million fractures occur annually in the United States due to osteoporosis, a figure that has shaped public health policy on bone disease.

His research has been cited more than 215,000 times across 779 published works (Scopus). In 2013, Melton was recognized as one of the Top 400 Most Cited Scientists in Biomedicine by the Map of Science.

== Selected publications ==
- WHO Study Group. (1994). "Assessment of fracture risk and its application to screening for postmenopausal osteoporosis." Osteoporosis International, 4(6), 368–381. PMID: 7696835. Cited 3,547 times. https://pubmed.ncbi.nlm.nih.gov/7696835/
- Cummings, S.R. & Melton, L.J. (2002). "Epidemiology and outcomes of osteoporotic fractures." The Lancet, 359(9319), 1761–1767. PMID: 12049882. Cited 5,607 times. https://pubmed.ncbi.nlm.nih.gov/12049882/
- Melton, L.J. III. (1996). "History of the Rochester Epidemiology Project." Mayo Clinic Proceedings, 71(3), 266–274. Cited 1,570 times. https://doi.org/10.1016/S0025-6196(11)63966-9
- Melton, L.J. III. (2012). "Better tools for assessing osteoporosis." Journal of Clinical Investigation. PMID: 23154276. https://pubmed.ncbi.nlm.nih.gov/23154276/
