= Deduplication =

The term deduplication refers generally to eliminating duplicate or redundant information.

- Data deduplication, in computer storage, refers to the elimination of redundant data
- Record linkage, in databases, refers to the task of finding entries that refer to the same entity in two or more files
