= Ht-//Dig =

ht://Dig
- Stable release: 3.2.0b6 / 16 June 2004; 21 years ago
- Written in: C++
- Operating system: Unix
- Type: Web search engine
- License: GNU General Public License
- Website: htdig.sourceforge.net
- Repository: sourceforge.net/p/htdig/code/

ht://Dig is a free software indexing and searching system created in 1995 by Andrew Scherpbier while he was employed at San Diego State University. It can provide a search engine for a single website.

It includes three groups of files: a set of tools for indexing, a set of tools for searching, and a set of HTML files for building the user interface to access the search engine. ht://Dig works differently from most search engines as most engines use a two-step process, building an index and searching it. ht://Dig indexes pages in full, then processes the pages into a searchable form later using soundex and metaphone. ht://Dig also stores fuzzy match information instead of using a dynamic algorithm. At one time, over 500 organizations used ht://Dig to index sites they owned. Notable sites included Blizzard Entertainment, Greenpeace, and The Mozilla Foundation.

The last official release is Dig 3.2.0b6 announced on 16 June 2004. Only sporadic maintenance is in evidence since that date at the project's bug reporting page. It was used by the GNU project's website for a long time but was replaced in 2008 with Hyper Estraier.

== See also ==
- Lucene
- Xapian
- Apache Solr
