= FreeCodeCamp =

Non-profit educational organization

Free Code Camp, Inc.
- Official freeCodeCamp logo
- Formation: October 2014; 12 years ago San Francisco, California
- Founder: Quincy Larson
- Tax ID no.: 82-0779546
- Legal status: 501(c)(3) nonprofit charity
- Purpose: Education and nonprofit work
- Region served: Worldwide
- Revenue: $4.28M (2022)
- Expenses: $1.39M (2022)
- Staff: 46 (2021)
- Volunteers: 4695 (2023)
- Website: freecodecamp.org

YouTube information
- Channel: freeCodeCamp.org
- Years active: 2014–present
- Genre: Education
- Subscribers: 11.3 million
- Views: 922.8 million
- Last updated: November 25, 2025

freeCodeCamp (also referred to as Free Code Camp) is a non-profit educational organization that consists of an interactive learning web platform, an online community forum, chat rooms, online publications and local organizations that intend to make learning software development & computer programming accessible to anyone.

Beginning with tutorials that introduce students to HTML, CSS, JavaScript, Python, C#, etc., students progress to project assignments that they complete either alone or in pairs.

== History ==
=== Quincy Larson and pre-freeCodeCamp ===
Before founding freeCodeCamp, Quincy Larson was a school director for six years before he started to learn to code so that he could create tools for making schools more efficient. His own journey into learning to code was long and winding and he recognized the need for a single-track curriculum for new developers. Upon analyzing data on coding boot camps in the US and realizing how inaccessible coding education was, he set out to create a fully-online inclusive free platform for peer-driven learning of coding — the result of which is freeCodeCamp.

He currently lives in Texas with his family and spends his time working on freeCodeCamp, writing and interviewing authors for the freeCodeCamp publication, co-ordinating open source projects such as Chapter (a free and open-source Meetup alternative), advocating for a free and open internet and playing with his two young kids.

=== Launch in 2014 ===
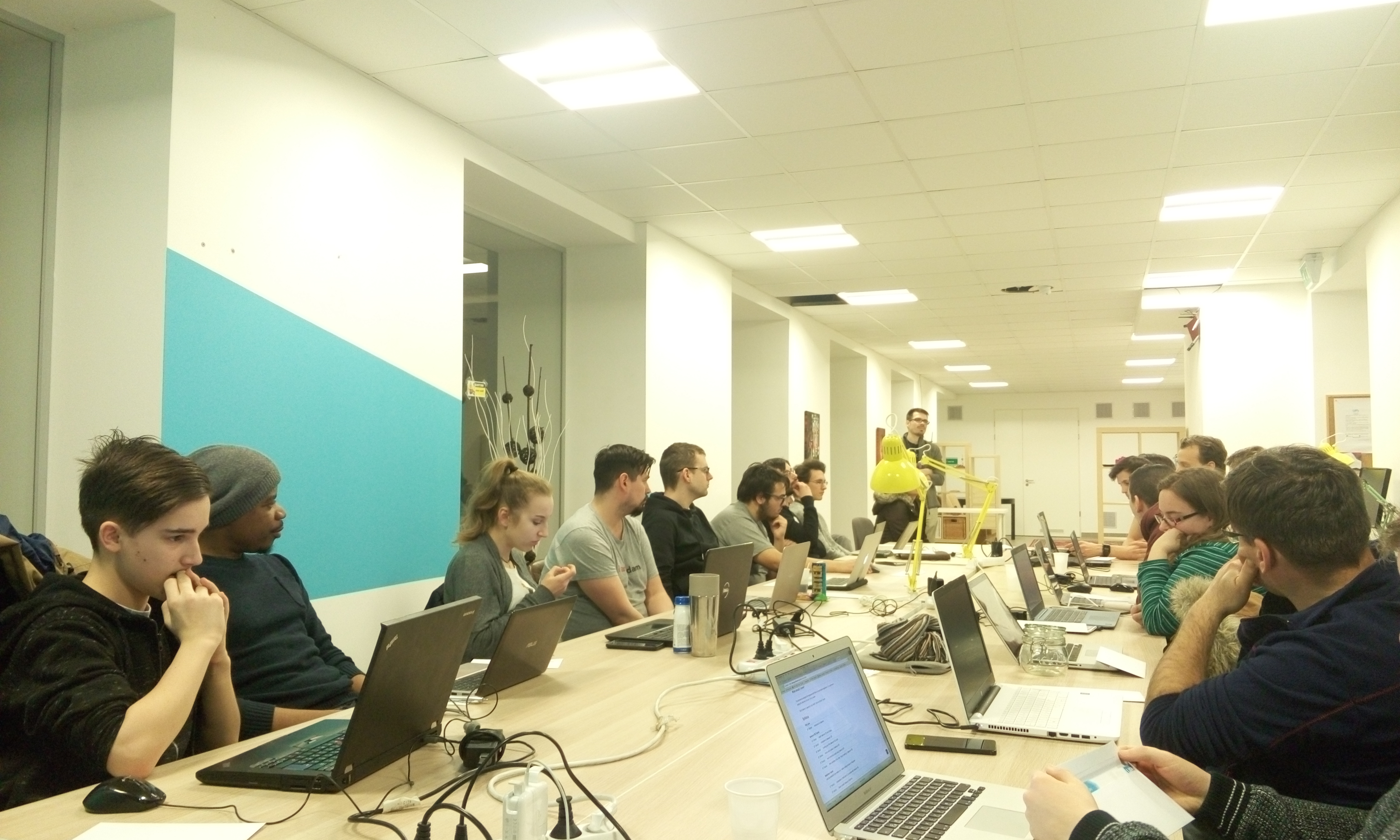
Learners meeting in person to go through the freeCodeCamp curriculum

freeCodeCamp was launched in October 2014 and incorporated as Free Code Camp, Inc. The founder, Quincy Larson, is a software developer who took up programming after graduate school and created freeCodeCamp as a way to streamline a student's progress from beginner to being job-ready.

In a 2015 podcast interview, he summarized his motivation for creating freeCodeCamp as follows:

freeCodeCamp is my effort to correct the extremely inefficient and circuitous way I learned to code. I'm committing my career and the rest of my life towards making this process as efficient and painless as possible. [...] All those things that made learning to code a nightmare to me are things that we are trying to fix with freeCodeCamp.

The original curriculum focused on MongoDB, Express.js, AngularJS, and Node.js and was estimated to take 800 hours to complete. Many of the lessons were links to free material on other platforms, such as Codecademy, Stanford, or Code School. The course was broken up into “Waypoints” (quick, interactive tutorials), “Bonfires” (algorithm challenges), “Ziplines” (front-end projects), and “Basejumps” (full-stack projects). Completing the front-end and full-stack projects awarded the student with respective certificates.

=== Curriculum update and developer survey in 2016 ===
The curriculum was updated in January 2016 to rely less on outside material, remove the unconventional section names, and switch focus from AngularJS to React.js as the front-end library of choice. There were a number of additions to the coursework, including D3.js and Sass, which brought the total time estimate to 2,080 hours and two more certificates, data visualization, and back-end.

Also in 2016, freeCodeCamp ran a survey on about 15,000 developers with questions on basic demographics and coding-related. Some findings include "only 18 percent said they’d like to work for a startup" and "thirty-eight percent don’t plan on specializing in UX, backend stuff or other specific disciplines".

=== Podcast launch in 2017 ===
In November 2017, freeCodeCamp launched a podcast. Following a hiatus from November 2019 to August 2023, the podcast is currently released weekly and as of October 2024, has 146 episodes. The podcast has had some notable guests such as Joel Spolsky (creator of Trello and Stack Overflow), Jeff Atwood (co-founded Stack Exchange), and David J. Malan (lead instructor of CS50).

=== Code Radio launch in 2018 ===
freeCodeCamp launched its internet radio station titled Code Radio in 2018. It originally started as a YouTube live stream and later moved to its own website, promising to be faster and data efficient. Music streamed on Code Radio are of instrumental downtempo genre.

== Curriculum ==
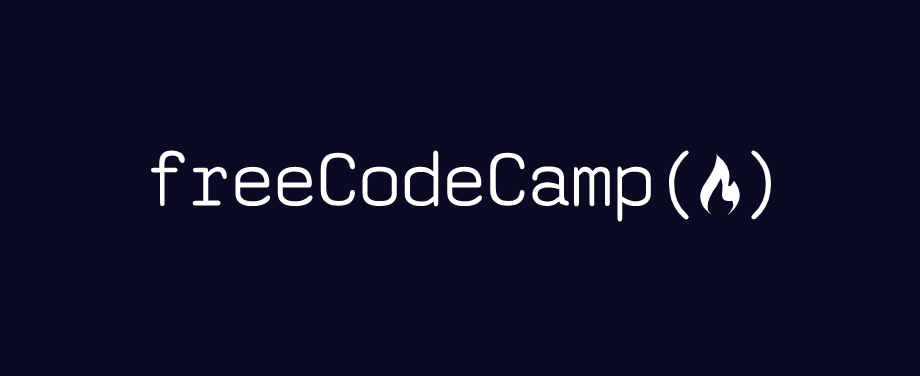
freeCodeCamp logo

The self-paced curriculum involves 1,400 hours of interactive coding challenges and web development projects, plus 800 hours of contributing to open-source projects for nonprofits and is constantly expanded by more challenges and projects. This translates into about one year of full-time coding. The curriculum is divided into Responsive Web Design, JavaScript Algorithms and Data Structures, Front End Libraries, Data Visualization, APIs and Microservices, and Information Security and Quality Assurance. Participants receive a certificate after completing each section.

The curriculum emphasizes pair programming, intended to foster a culture of collaboration and shared learning, which can overcome a student's doubts about the adequacy of their skills (popularly referred to as “impostor syndrome”).

The languages and technologies currently taught by freeCodeCamp include HTML, PHP, CSS, JavaScript, jQuery, Bootstrap, Sass, React.js, Node.js, Python, Express.js, MongoDB, SQL, and Git.

Example coding explainer tutorial going through a freeCodeCamp lesson

To celebrate freeCodeCamp's 8th birthday on October 25, 2022, Quincy Larson published a tweet that announced free accredited degree programs in mathematics and computer science are currently in active development. Official release dates are still to be determined.

In 2023, freeCodeCamp partnered with Microsoft to develop a Foundational C# Certification.

Launched in 2015, the freeCodeCamp YouTube channel reached 10 million subscribers in October 2024. The channel contains more than 700 full-length free-to-watch programming courses, and new courses are published every week.

== Nonprofit work ==
Until 2017, as students of freeCodeCamp finished all certificates of the curriculum, they get the opportunity, and were encouraged, to work with nonprofit organizations. Examples include Indonesia-based nonprofit Kopernik and People Saving Animals.

In 2016, freeCodeCamp announced their "Open Source for Good" initiative, which extends and open sources their nonprofit work to all nonprofits and organizations to use. Within ten months of launching, the initiative has created seven open-source tools. Mail for Good is one of the projects, which helps organizations send bulk email messages at a low cost, which serves as a cheaper alternative to services such as MailChimp.

The three projects listed under "Open Source for Good" directory have all been archived on GitHub in 2020.

== Reception ==
freeCodeCamp's platform is used by about 350,000 unique visitors per month, with students from over 160 countries.

freeCodeCamp has international, community-run groups where students can interact in person. Some groups have been featured in local news, citing freeCodeCamp as an introduction to programming in order to fill the estimated vacancy in programming-related jobs in the next decade.

Other technology companies have described freeCodeCamp as, "a renowned charity with a world-class learning platform", and "maintains an excellent YouTube channel, and is a good place to start."
