= Datamyne =

Descartes Datamyne
- Type: Private
- Industry: International Trade Data
- Predecessor: URUNET (founded in 1992)
- Founded: 2003
- Defunct: 2016
- Fate: Acquired
- Successor: Descartes Systems Group
- Headquarters: Miami, Florida, United States
- Key people: Jonathan Wendell (Chairman); Brendan McCahill (CEO)
- Products: US maritime data, multinational customs data
- Website: www.datamyne.com

Datamyne was a privately held American corporation that provides access to a searchable database of import-export trade of 50 countries across five continents. The company was founded in 2003 and was acquired by Descartes Systems Group in December 2016. The purchase price for the acquisition was approximately US$52.7 million in cash.

== History ==
The business traces its origins back to the founding in 1992 by Pablo Milburn of URUNET, an online source for Uruguayan foreign trade data. In 1997, Milburn launched Argentina-based Mercosur Online, offering Customs-sourced data on the import-export trade of the Mercosur trade bloc's four founding members (Argentina, Brazil, Paraguay, and Uruguay).

Named a “high-impact entrepreneur” by Endeavor Global in 2003, Milburn obtained private equity backing from Greenwich, CT-based Nassau Point Investors to expand operations to the U.S. It raised additional equity through a private offering in 2010.

Incorporated (in Delaware) in 2005, Miami-headquartered Datamyne opened for business offering online access to U.S. import-export trade data, including U.S. maritime import data, and South American trade data.

In December 2016, the company was acquired by Descartes Systems Group.

Descartes Datamyne then expanded its trade database coverage to include the trade of the US NAFTA partners Canada and Mexico, 16 countries in Central and South America, the EU member nations, as well as China, India, Japan, Russia, South Korea and South Africa. Taken together, these countries accounted for nearly three-quarters of all global trade in 2013 based on WTO-UNCTAD statistics.

As a part of Descartes Systems Group, the products join the Descartes Global Trade Content suite of products.

== Products ==
Descartes Datamyne's trade data is collected from the documents of import-export transactions filed with customs authorities and trade ministries.

The trade data is used to develop commercial intelligence for businesses – principally in the transport sector that supports trade, and in vertical industries that operate on a global footing, such as chemicals, mining, food and beverage, and apparel.

Descartes Datamyne provides unmetered access, which includes search, analysis and reporting tools, to all or selected countries’ in its database by annual subscription. In addition, the company offers custom international market research services. Descartes Datamyne also provides data to government agencies, NGOs, and the media such as the New York Times, Wall Street Journal and Miami Herald in the U.S. and Clarín in Argentina.

The company was recognized by the Association of Independent Information Professionals for providing access to trade data with a pay-as-you-go pricing option useful to independent information professionals.

Its flagship product is data on the waterborne trade between the U.S. and its 240 distinct geographic markets. Sourced from maritime bills of lading, this data covers the details of transactions including cargo descriptions, ports of departure and arrival, and shipping lines, as well as the names of importing companies and foreign suppliers, which are linked to Dun & Bradstreet background information.

== Operations ==
Descartes Datamyne was headquartered in Miami, and maintains locations in Jacksonville, Chicago, Los Angeles, and the New York metropolitan area. The company also has sales offices in Montevideo, Uruguay, Buenos Aires, Argentina, and São Paulo, Brazil. Now a part of Descartes, the company's world headquarters are located in Waterloo, Ontario, Canada.

Datamyne's data collection and processing operations were located in Montevideo, Uruguay. The data center was certified compliant with ISO 9001:2008 standards of quality management systems and processes for development, marketing and after sales care.
