= Denied trade screening =

Screening parties to an export transaction

Denied trade screening is the process of screening parties involved in both domestic and export transactions for the purpose of complying with the safety standards and sanction lists of the U.S. Government. Effective trade screening not only includes denied parties but also controlled products and embargoed or sanctioned countries. The purpose of screening the receiving parties of finished goods is to exude "due diligence" and "reasonable care" when completing transactions with foreign entities, ensuring the safety and intention of the products and importers.

The U.S. government restricts all its individuals or companies from exporting any service or product to any party contained in a U.S. government export denial, blocked, and debarred persons lists. The failure to comply with the above regulation is a violation of U.S. law and can result in criminal or civil prosecution, as well as denial of export privileges.

== Lists ==
With 80-plus denied trade lists already published, more items and checks need to be included in an exporter's validation process. Exporters demonstrating "reasonable care" should perform screenings on a periodic basis as well as perform screenings throughout the movement of the goods within the supply chain. With more country-specific rules being applied, countries have their own denied party lists, some of which include:

- World Bank Listing of Ineligible Firms
- U.S. Bureau of Industry and Security (BIS)
- EU Financial Sanctions Unit
- U.S. Food & Drug Administration
- United Nations Sanction List
- Alqaida and Taliban UN Consolidated List
- Office of Foreign Assets Control
- International Criminal Tribunal for Rwanda

Every organization is responsible for updating and maintaining information about the parties to whom they ship. The U.S. government encourages exporters to perform screenings on a regular schedule. Companies, groups, and persons found on the lists are sanctioned by the United States government and are not allowed to receive exported goods from the U.S. or export goods to the U.S. Typically, depending on which list the match was found, a match would indicate either of the following situations: 1) A strict export prohibition, 2) A specific license requirement for exporting to or making a business with the sanctioned entity, or 3) The presence of a "red flag" in this transaction with the sanctioned entity.

== Software tools ==
Software vendors, such as AEB, ThomsonReuters Global Trade Management, Visual Compliance, Amber Road, Inc., and MIC Customs Solutions automate the process of searching for denied trade parties and restricted trade parties.

Companies such as Descartes Systems Group have established working software for screening against multiple lists. SAP, an ERP software, offers software since 2004. The software for SAP America is the Global Trade Services module (SAP-GTS) which falls under their Governance, Risk, and Compliance (GRC) directory of software.

International Trade Administration (ITA), US Department of Commerce started to provide open data via API for developers. Developers need to register for the API to get a key. This API service provides many search options that could be used for US Sanctions Screening.
