= Bitcasa =

Defunct American cloud storage company

- Original authors: Tony Gauda; Kevin Blackham
- Developers: Bitcasa, Inc.
- Release: September 2011
- Operating system: Microsoft Windows; OS X Android; Linux
- Type: Cloud storage
- Website: www.bitcasa.com

Bitcasa, Inc. was an American cloud storage company founded in 2011 in St. Louis, Missouri. The company was later based in Mountain View, California until it shut down in 2017.

Bitcasa provided client software for Microsoft Windows, OS X, Android and web browsers. An iOS client was pending Apple approval. Its former product, Infinite Drive, once provided centralized storage that included unlimited capacity, client-side encryption, media streaming, file versioning and backups, and multi-platform mobile access. In 2013 Bitcasa moved to a tiered storage model, offering from 1TB for $99/year up to Infinite for $999/year. In October 2014, Bitcasa announced the discontinuation of Infinite Drive; for $999/year, users would get 10TB of storage. Infinite Drive users would be required to migrate to one of the new pricing plans or delete their account. In May 2016, Bitcasa discontinued offering cloud storage for consumers, alleging that they will be focusing on their business products.

== History ==
The company started after an idea that was a finalist at the TechCrunch Disrupt conference in September 2011. In 2012 Tony Lee was recruited as vice president of engineering and Frank Meehan joined the company's board of directors. In June 2012 Bitcasa closed $9 million of investment. Investors included: CrunchFund, Pelion Venture Partners, Horizons Ventures, Andreessen Horowitz, Samsung Ventures and First Round Capital.

In January 2017, CEO Brian Taptich announced that Bitcasa had been acquired by Intel. An Intel spokesperson later clarified that Intel had not acquired Bitcasa.

== Products and services ==
Bitcasa provided client software for web browsers, OS X, Microsoft Windows, Linux and a mobile app for Android. Windows versions include XP, Vista, Windows 7 and Windows 8.

Bitcasa products provide centralized streaming storage so that all devices have simultaneous and real-time access to the same files. Files uploaded from one device are instantly available on all devices. Bitcasa does not require file syncing between devices. Centralized storage eliminates the need to duplicate files across devices or wait for files to become synchronized.

The company has a patent pending for an "infinite storage" algorithm designed to reduce the actual storage space by identifying duplicate content and providing encryption of the stored data. According to Popular Mechanics magazine, Bitcasa uses a convergent encryption method whereby a client's data is assigned an anonymous identifier before it is uploaded. If that data already exists on the Bitcasa servers (such as a popular song), it is not uploaded but is instead earmarked as available for download by that client. This protocol is said to reduce upload time. Bitcasa's encryption method reportedly cloaks the data while it is still on the client's computer and then blocks of data are sent by an enterprise-grade AES-256 encryption method to the data cloud for storage. According to ExtremeTech, this service gives users access and ownership rights to their own data.

In a review by Gizmodo of Australia, Bitcasa's cloud service was described as a "winner" that is "pricier than its competitors" but supported by Mac, PC and Android platforms.

=== Mobile ===
Users could access their Infinite Drive through mobile apps for Android, Windows RT, and browsers and support offline viewing of files. The app collects and displays individual media types such as photos, video, music, and documents, independently of the folder hierarchy that they are stored in. Video files are streamed and auto-transcoded based on the device bandwidth. Items may be uploaded or downloaded or shared directly with social media sites. Files of any size can be shared with a web link that can distributed via email, text or IM. After the initial server migration, only apps for Android, iOS and browsers were updated, effectively rendering other devices unusable with the service.

== Security ==
A September 2011 article published in Extreme Tech said that Bitcasa's convergent encryption based system is "mostly" safe but has some risks associated with it.

== New pricing and changes ==
=== November 2013 ===
On November 19, 2013, the company announced that its Infinite Storage offering would increase in price. The move sparked an intense reaction from users at the company's forum, even though existing users were grandfathered into the original pricing plan. Reactions from bloggers were particularly critical. The announcement of the pricing plans change on the Bitcasa blog was commented on heavily by users. This post, and the ensuing comments were removed from the internet by Bitcasa. Bitcasa introduced an interface for developers.

=== October 2014 ===
On October 23, 2014, Bitcasa announced it would be removing all of its grandfathered 'infinite' plans. Although the company had assured customers that these plans would be continued as long as they had not cancelled their service. Later the company removed their official blog post about this, though it is still available on the WayBack Machine. Bitcasa backtracked due to 'lack of demand' and 'abuse'.

The company instead offered previous clients the same packages that regular users pay at $10/month for 1TB ($99 annually) or $99/month for 10TB ($999 annually).

The company gave users 23 days to migrate or download their data, or it would be deleted. This move was criticized by many users as not being physically possible at the download rates provided by Bitcasa.

As a result of a system migration, some users had data loss, some of which was not replaceable. Angry customers gave the company bad feedback, and the community forum became less active.

The company has offered yearly subscribers the right to cancel and get a prorated refund. However, it disabled the ability to cancel accounts and refused to delete accounts through its support system.

On November 13, 2014, Northern Californian district judge William Alsup granted a temporary restraining order, enjoining Bitcasa from deleting and disabling access to Infinite Plan subscribers' data. Bitcasa filed a response on 18 November, challenging the legality of the TRO. As an apparent result of the restraining order, Bitcasa announced a 5-day extension of the deadline in an email to users on November 16; the email did not mention the restraining order. A hearing was set for 10.00 on 19 November; Bitcasa 'won' the lawsuit.

In February 2015, the Community Forum was shut down.

=== April 2016 ===
On April 7, 2016, the company switched their free 5GB plan to a free trial tier. Users with this account prior April 7 would automatically start the trial and after the 60-day trial, if the user has not changed to a paid plan, their account and data will be deleted from the server.

On April 21, 2016, Bitcasa announced they would discontinue their cloud storage service, and focus on business products. Users had until May 20, 2016 to download their data, when user data could be deleted. Bitcasa shut down their consumer cloud storage at the end of May 20, 2016, only offering products for developers.

=== September 2016 ===
After four months, they did not refund customers and the website of Bitcasa was inaccessible.

== See also ==
- Comparison of file hosting services
- Comparison of online backup services
