= IES =

The initialism IES may refer to:

== Government organizations ==
- Indian Economic Service
- Indian Education Service, in British India
- Institute for Environment and Sustainability of the European Commission
- Institute of Education Sciences of the U.S. Department of Education

== Non-profit organizations ==
- Institute for the International Education of Students
- Illuminating Engineering Society
- International Enterprise Singapore
- International Society of Endocrinology
- Israel Endocrine Society
- Israel Exploration Society
- Institution of Environmental Sciences

== Companies ==
- IES Ltd (Integrated Export Systems), a transportation software company
- Integrated Electrical Services
- Internationella Engelska Skolan

== Other ==
- Indian Engineering Services
- The Indrema Entertainment System, also known as the L600, an unreleased sixth generation video game console
- Integrated Encryption Scheme, in cryptography, a public key cryptosystem
- Intertemporal elasticity of substitution
- Intuitive eating scale
