= Phonetic matching =

Phonetic matching may refer to:

- Phono-semantic matching
- Phonetic algorithm, an algorithms for phonetic string matching.
