= Fast Duplicate File Finder =

- Developer: MindGems Inc.
- Operating system: Microsoft Windows
- Platform: Intel x86 32-bit and x64
- Available in: English
- Type: File managers
- License: Freemium
- Website: www.mindgems.com

Fast Duplicate File Finder is a Windows tool developed by MindGems Inc, available as a freeware version and a full commercial version. It is intended to scan a user's computer for duplicate files, display a list of such files and let the user delete unneeded copies with the purpose of freeing up hard drive space. It is compatible with Windows 11, 10 8.1, 8 and 7 as well as Windows Server 2008, in both 32-bit and 64-bit versions.

== Reception ==
- Overclockers review from February 2009:
  - Citarella, Joe (June 18, 2009). "Fast Duplicate File Finder - Freeware Utility". Overclockers Review.
- CNET review from February 2011:
  - "Fast Duplicate File Finder - CNET Download.com". CNET Review. January 18, 2011.
- PC World review from March 2011:
  - "Fast Duplicate File Finder". PCWorld Review. March 2, 2011.
- OCT review from July 2024:
  - Edmunds, Dan (7 July 2024). "Find Duplicate Files and then Copy, Move or Delete Them". OnlineComputerTips.
