= Permabit =

Permabit Technology Corporation
- Type: Private
- Industry: Computer data storage
- Founded: 2000
- Defunct: 2017
- Headquarters: Cambridge, Massachusetts
- Key people: Tom Cook; (CEO and President); Jered Floyd; (CTO and Founder); Louis Imershein; (VP Product); Brett Hawkes; (VP BizDev)

Permabit Technology Corporation was a private supplier of data reduction solutions to the computer data storage industry.

Red Hat had acquired the assets and technology of Permabit Technology Corporation in July 2017.

== Permabit Albireo ==
The Permabit Albireo family of products are designed with data reduction features. The common component among these products is the Albireo index - a hash datastore. Three products in the Albireo family range from an embedded SDK (offering integration with existing storage) to a ready-to-deploy appliance.

- Albireo SDK – a software development kit designed to add data deduplication to hardware devices or software applications that benefit from sharing duplicate chunks.
- Albireo VDO – a drop-in data efficiency solution for Linux architectures. VDO provides fine-grained (4 KB chunk), inline deduplication, thin provisioning, compression and replication.
- Albireo SANblox – a ready-to-run data efficiency appliance that integrates data deduplication and data compression transparently into Fibre Channel SAN environments.

== History ==
Permabit was founded as Permabit Inc. in 2000 by a technical and business team from Massachusetts Institute of Technology. The company went through a management buyout in 2007 and a new business entity, Permabit Technology Corporation, was formed at that time.

Permabit’s first product, Permabit Enterprise Archive (originally known as Permeon) was a multi-PB scalable, content-addressable, scale-out storage product, first launched in 2004. Enterprise Archive utilized in-house developed technologies in the areas of capacity optimization, WORM, storage management and data protection.

In 2010, Permabit launched the Albireo family of products which focus on licensing Permabit data efficiency and management innovations to original equipment manufacturers, software vendors and online service providers. Publicly acknowledged companies that offer Albireo-based solutions include Dell EMC, Hitachi Data Systems, IBM, NEC, and NetApp.

In 2016, Permabit launched its data reduction software for data center organizations that utilize the Linux operating system in Cloud Computing environments.

On July 31, 2017, Red Hat announced that it has acquired the assets and technology of Permabit Technology Corporation.
