= David J. Malan =

American computer scientist and professor

David Malan
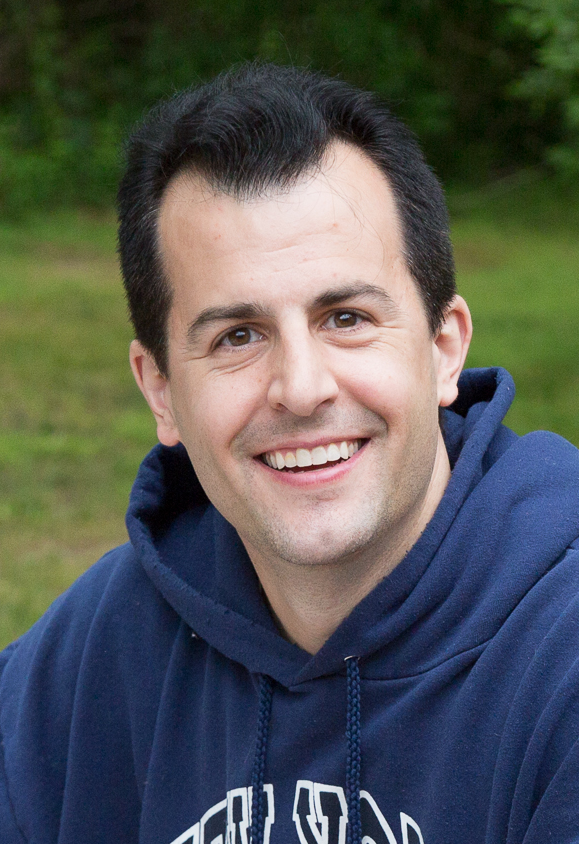
- Born: David Jay Malan
- Education: Harvard University (BA, MS, PhD)
- Known for: CS50
- Scientific career
- Fields: Botnets; Cybersecurity; Digital forensics; Computer science education; Distance learning; Collaborative learning; Computer-assisted instruction
- Workplaces: Harvard University; Tufts University; Mindset Media; AirClic; Diskaster
- Thesis: Rapid detection of botnets through collaborative networks of peers (2007)
- Doctoral advisor: Michael D. Smith
- Website: cs.harvard.edu/malan

David Jay Malan (/meɪlɛn/) is an American computer scientist and professor. Malan is a Gordon McKay Professor of Computer Science at Harvard University, and is best known for teaching the course CS50, which is the largest open-learning course at Harvard University and Yale University and the largest massive open online course at EdX, with lectures being viewed by over a million people on the edX platform up to 2017.

Malan is a professor at Harvard John A. Paulson School of Engineering and Applied Sciences, where his research interests include cybersecurity, digital forensics, botnets, computer science education, distance learning, collaborative learning, and computer-assisted instruction.

== Education ==
Malan enrolled at Harvard College, initially studying government, and took CS50 in the fall of 1996, which was taught by Brian Kernighan at the time. Inspired by Kernighan, Malan began his education in computer science, graduating with a Bachelor of Arts degree in Computer Science in 1999. After a period working outside of academia, he returned to postgraduate studies to complete a Master of Science degree in 2004, followed by a PhD in 2007 for research into cybersecurity and computer forensics, supervised by Michael D. Smith.

== Teaching ==
Malan is known for teaching CS50, an introductory course in Computer Science for majors and non-majors that aims to develop computational thinking skills, using tools like Scratch, C, Python, SQL, HTML and JavaScript. As of 2016 the course has 800 students enrolled at Harvard College each year, making it the largest course there. CS50 is available on edX as CS50x, with over a million views from the lectures. His courses on EdX are known by being taken by people of all ages. All of his courses are freely available and licensed for re-use with attribution using OpenCourseWare, for example at cs50.tv. CS50 also exists as CS50 AP (Advanced Placement), an adaptation for high schools that satisfies the AP Computer Science Principles of the College Board.

Besides CS50, Malan also teaches at Harvard Extension School and Harvard Summer School. Prior to teaching at Harvard, Malan taught mathematics and computer science at Franklin High School and Tufts University.

== Career and research ==
During 2001 to 2002 he worked for AirClic as an Engineering Manager.

While undergoing his undergraduate studies, Malan worked part-time for the District Attorney's Office in Middlesex County, Virginia as a forensic investigator, after which he founded his own two startups. On the side since 2003, he volunteered as an emergency medical technician (EMT-B) for MIT-Emergency Medical Services (EMS). He continues to volunteer as an EMT-B for the American Red Cross.

Malan founded and was the chairman of Diskaster, a data recovery firm that offered professional recovery of data from hard drives and memory cards, as well as forensic investigations for civil matters.

Malan worked for Mindset Media from 2008 to 2011 as Chief Information Officer (CIO), where he was responsible for advertising the network’s scalability, security, and capacity planning. He designed infrastructure for the collection of massive datasets capable of 500 million HTTP requests per day, with peaks of 10K per second. In 2011, Mindset Media was acquired by Meebo.

Malan is also an active member of the SIGCSE community, a Special Interest Group (SIG) concerned with Computer Science Education (CSE) organized by the Association for Computing Machinery (ACM).

In 2024, Malan purchased the historic Regent Theatre in Arlington, Massachusetts.
