= Imanet =

Software company in Canada

- Founded: 1989
- Founder: Cedomir Bekic
- Headquarters: Windsor Ontario

Imanet was a software company based in Windsor Ontario, servicing the international trade community.

Imanet's core products are in the areas of customs brokerage and freight forwarding. Founded in 1989 by Cedomir Bekic, Imanet focuses on developing a highly automated and unified platform tying together customs brokerage, freight forwarding and accounting into one efficient database. They also have developed their own document management system which use linux based servers at client sites to provide FAX-to-SCP on the back end with a .NET based web GUI on the front end for customs filing, entry automation and text manipulation.

In 2005 Imanet software was used to process well over 25% of all shipments coming into Canada.

In 2010 Imanet was purchased by Descartes Systems Group, a software as a service provider based in Waterloo, Ontario.
