= Visual Compliance =

Descartes Visual Compliance
- Company type: Public
- Industry: Global Trade Management; Supply Chain Management, Import/Export Management
- Headquarters: Buffalo, New York, USA
- Key people: Marc Roy (General Manager and VP Compliance Solutions); Steven Crozier (VP, Director of Technology); Selina Kwan (VP Finance)
- Website: www.visualcompliance.com

Descartes Visual Compliance (USA) LLC (dba "Visual Compliance") is a technology company that specializes in global trade compliance solutions, in particular applications that allow thousands of subscribers located in over 100 countries to screen for denied and restricted parties. The company was acquired by Descartes Systems Group in February 2019. The purchase price for the acquisition was approximately US $250 million.

== Operations ==
Visual Compliance is based in Canada and serves over 2,000 customers with over 67,500 subscribers operating in over 100 countries.

Visual Compliance users include small business, research institutions, government organizations, Fortune 500 companies, and universities, scientific research institutions, among them NASA, MIT, University of Texas, University of Florida, among many others. Inbound Logistics named Visual Compliance one of the Top 100 Logistics IT Providers in 2016, 2017 and 2018.

== History ==
Rajiv Manucha founded the company in 1981. Visual Compliance grew from a three-person operation to one with approximately 100 employees in offices located in Toronto, Ontario and Buffalo, New York. In February 2019, Visual Compliance joined Descartes Systems Group.

== See also ==
- Denied trade screening
- International trade
- U.S. Customs and Border Protection
