= Rochester Epidemiology Project =

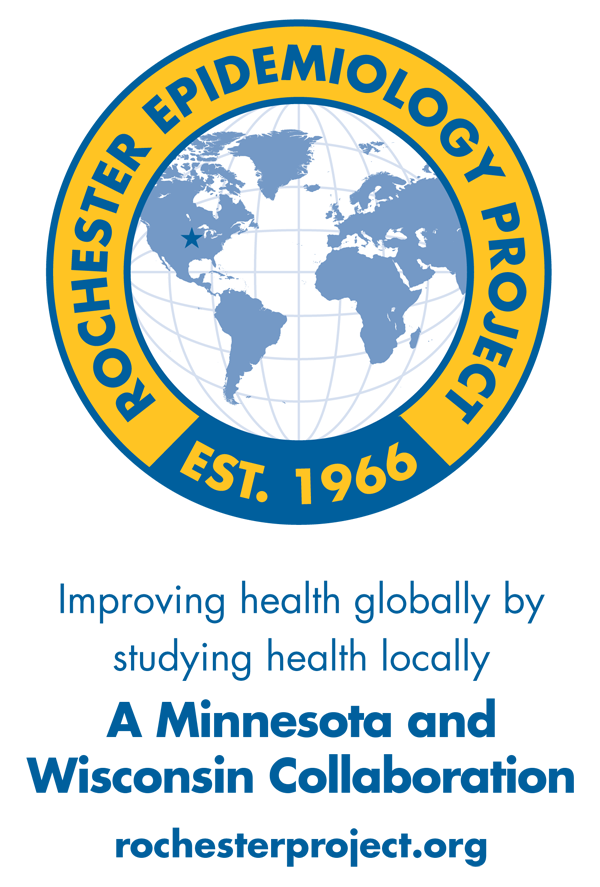
- Abbreviation: REP
- Formation: 1966
- Type: Community-based health research project; Records-linkage system
- Legal status: NIH-funded project
- Purpose: Research
- Location: Rochester, Minnesota
- Region served: Southern Minnesota; Western Wisconsin
- Principal Investigators: Walter A. Rocca, MD, MPH; Jennifer St. Sauver, PhD, MPH
- Website: rochesterproject.org

The Rochester Epidemiology Project (REP) is a unique records-linkage research infrastructure that has existed since 1966, and allows for population-based medical research in Olmsted County, Minnesota and an expanded region of 27 counties in Southern Minnesota and Western Wisconsin. The project has been continually funded by the National Institutes of Health since 1966. Specifically, the REP links medical data (diagnosis, procedure, prescription medication, laboratory testing) to unique persons across the many participating medical providers in the region. The project is a collaboration between Olmsted Medical Center, Mayo Clinic, Olmsted County Public Health Services, Mayo Clinic Health System, Zumbro Valley Health Center, and many other historical partners.

== History ==
The REP was originally funded by the National Institute of General Medical Sciences in 1966 under the direction of Dr. Leonard T. Kurland, a neurologist who started his career at the NIH and moved to Olmsted County, Minnesota when he realized the great benefit to medical research that a population-based records-linkage system could have. Dr. Kurland considered Olmsted County an optimal location for such a population-based research infrastructure because the county is relatively isolated from other metropolitan centers, almost all medical care is received within the county, and all medical specialties are available to county residents. More recently, the study funding source changed to the National Institute of Arthritis and Musculoskeletal and Skin Diseases, and as of July 2010 the REP is funded by the National Institute on Aging. In September 2016, the REP celebrated 50 years of continuous NIH funding. More recently, the REP is also supported by the Mayo Clinic Research Committee and by data access fees paid annually by individual projects using the REP for their research.

== The population ==
=== Original REP ===
The REP was originally designed to completely cover the health experience of the local population of Olmsted County, Minnesota. The REP includes the medical records of all persons who have ever lived in Olmsted County, Minnesota, from January 1, 1966 to the present, and who have given permission for their medical information to be used for research under Minnesota Research Authorization regulations. The Olmsted County population comprises more than 500,000 unique persons and more than 6 million person-years of follow-up through 2010. Historically, the Olmsted County population is less racially diverse and is more highly educated than the US as a whole; however, it has been found to be similar to the state of Minnesota and surrounding states (Wisconsin, Iowa, North Dakota, and South Dakota). The Olmsted County population encompasses about 160,000 persons as of the 2020 US Decennial Census.

=== Expanded REP ===
Beginning in 2010, the linkage of electronic medical data from a region extending beyond the Olmsted County, Minnesota area became possible. In 2018, REP authors extensively described an expanded 27-county region of Southern Minnesota (19 counties: Brown, Watonwan, Martin, Nicollet, Blue Earth, Faribault, Le Sueur, Waseca, Freeborn, Rice, Steele, Goodhue, Dodge, Mower, Olmsted, Wabasha, Winona, Fillmore, and Houston) and Western Wisconsin (8 counties: La Crosse, Trempealeau, Buffalo, Pepin, Eau Claire, Barron, Dunn, and Chippewa) The expanded REP captures and links the medical data of nearly 700,000 persons from the year 2010 to present (about 60% of the 27-county region as compared to the US Census). The REP has created a data sharing tool called the Data Exploration Portal where researchers can explore the medical and personal characteristics of this population. The expansion of the REP to a larger region and population has also made the study of very rare conditions possible.

== Scientific contributions ==
The REP has contributed significantly to the understanding of many diseases, including epilepsy, rheumatoid arthritis, osteoporosis, Parkinson's disease, dementia and Alzheimer's disease, heart failure, stroke, multiple myeloma, deep vein thrombosis, multimorbidity, and many others. Since its inception, the REP has supported more than 3,000 peer-reviewed scientific publications spanning almost every field of medicine.
