= IES Ltd =

Supply chain management company

IES, Ltd.
- Company type: Private
- Founded: 1989
- Headquarters: Ontario, Canada
- Website: www.iesltd.com

IES, Ltd. was a supply chain management software company that developed software for freight forwarders, customs brokers, 3PLs, importers, exporters, NVOCCs and other intermediaries to submit entries to the U.S. Customs and Border Protection, Canada Border Services Agency and other agencies.

Customers included Kühne + Nagel, Emo Trans, Crowley Maritime, FedEx.

IES was acquired by The Descartes Systems Group Inc. on June 15, 2012. Descartes is a publicly traded company, ticker symbol TSX: DSG, NASDAQ: DSGX.

Prior to the acquisition by Descartes Systems Group, the software company was originally established in October 1989 and was headquartered in Midland Park, New Jersey, United States, with offices and locations in Hong Kong, Boston and Atlanta.

IES was featured in numerous industry publications such as The Washington Post, The Journal of Commerce, American Shipper, Inbound Logistics, DC Velocity and more.

== See also ==
- Demand chain
- Demand chain management
- Demand optimization
- Distribution
- Distribution resource planning
- Inventory control
- Liquid logistics
- Logistics
- RedPrairie
- Reverse logistics
- Supply network
- Supply chain management
- Supply chain network
- Supply chain optimization
- Supply Chain Risk Management
- Supply chain security
- Value chain
- Value network
- Vertical integration
- Warehouse management system
