= Descartes Systems Group =

Canadian multinational technology company

The Descartes Systems Group Inc.
- Type: Public
- Traded as: TSX: DSG; Nasdaq: DSGX
- Industry: Computer software; Cloud computing; Supply chain management
- Founded: May 22, 1981; 45 years ago
- Headquarters: Waterloo, Ontario, Canada
- Area served: Worldwide
- Key people: Edward J. Ryan (CEO); J. Scott Pagan (president and COO); Allan Brett (CFO)
- Products: Software-as-a-service applications for logistics and supply chain management
- Services: Transportation Management, Routing, Mobile & Telematics Software, Global Trade Intelligence, Customs and Regulatory Compliance, E-Commerce Shipping & Fulfilment Software, Broker & Forward Enterprise Systems, and B2B Connectivity and Messaging
- Revenue: ▲US$ >600 million (2025)
- Net income: ▲US$ 143.3 million (2025)
- Total assets: ▲US$ 1,647.4 million (2025)
- Total equity: ▲US$ 1,385.008 million (2025)
- Number of employees: 2000+
- Website: descartes.com

The Descartes Systems Group Inc. (commonly referred to as Descartes or DSG) is a Canadian multinational technology company specializing in logistics software, supply chain management software, and cloud-based services for logistics businesses.

Descartes is known as one of the earliest logistics technology companies to adopt an on-demand business model and sell its software as a service (SaaS) via the Internet. In addition, the company operates the Global Logistics Network, an extensive electronic messaging system used by freight companies, manufacturers, distributors, retailers, customs brokers, government agencies, and other interested parties to exchange logistics and customs information.

Headquartered in Waterloo, Ontario, Canada, Descartes is a publicly traded company with shares listed on the NASDAQ Stock Market (NASDAQ: DSGX) and Toronto Stock Exchange (TSX: DSG). It has offices in the Americas, Europe, the Middle East, Africa, and the Asia Pacific region.

== History ==
Descartes was founded in 1981.

In 1998, the company made an initial public offering on the Toronto Stock Exchange, where its common shares traded under the stock symbol DSG. Descartes was first listed on the NASDAQ Stock Market in 1999, with common shares trading under the symbol DSGX. Descartes’ share price peaked during the dot-com bubble in 2000, and then fell precipitously in the subsequent crash.

In 2001, Descartes switched its business model from selling full-featured enterprise software licenses to providing on-demand software on a subscription basis, becoming one of the first SaaS providers in the logistics sector. After years of losses, Descartes came close to bankruptcy in 2004, prompting it to aggressively restructure. The company cut 35% of its workforce and initiated a sweeping transformation of its corporate culture under CEO Arthur Mesher, who was appointed in 2005.

The company returned to profitability in 2005, with Difference Capital Managing Director, Tom Liston, describing this as "one of the most dramatic turnarounds in Canadian corporate history."

In December 2013, Descartes was added to the S&P/TSX Composite Index, an index of the stock (equity) prices of the largest companies on the Toronto Stock Exchange.

By January, 2015, Descartes had posted 41 straight profitable quarters and was supplying logistics software and services to more than 10,000 logistics-centric businesses, such as ground transportation companies, airlines, ocean carriers, freight forwarders, manufacturers, distributors, and retailers. Its customers included American Airlines, Delta Air Lines, Air Canada, British Airways, Maersk Group, Hapag-Lloyd, Con-way, Kuehne + Nagel, DHL, The Home Depot, Sears Brands, Hallmark Cards, Hasbro, Volvo, Ferrellgas, Del Monte, Toyota, and The Coca-Cola Company.

In 2018, Gartner ranked Descartes 6th in its list of the Top 20 Supply Chain Management Software Suppliers, based on revenue of $221 million.

In 2025, Descartes was also recognised by the ARC Advisory Group as the leading provider of cloud-based Transport Management Systems (TMS) and the leading provider of fleet management applications.

As of 2025, 5 Descartes products are recognised in the Top 50 Supply Chain & Logistics Products list on G2, and the company is recognised as the #1 Grid™ Leader in 12 categories.

== Acquisitions ==
Acquisitions have played a key role in Descartes’ growth. By acquiring niche technology companies, Descartes has expanded its line of logistics software and services, enlarged its customer base, and extended its business geographically.

Acquisitions going back to 2006 are listed below.

Year acquired	Company	Specialty	Country	References
2006	ViaSafe	Cross-border and regulatory compliance software	Canada	
2006	Flagship Customs Services	Customs filing software	US	
2006	Cube Route	On-demand logistics management software	Canada	
2007	Ocean Tariff Bureau and Blue Pacific Services	Tariff filing & contract publishing and surety bonds for ocean intermediaries	US	
2007	Global Freight Exchange (GF-X)	Electronic air cargo booking system	UK	
2007	RouteView Technologies	Delivery management software	US	
2008	Pacific Coast Tariff Bureau	Regulatory compliance services	US	
2008	Mobitrac Fleet Management Business	Fleet routing and scheduling SaaS	US	
2008	Dexx	European customs filing and logistics messaging	Belgium	
2009	Oceanwide	SaaS customs and regulatory compliance	Canada/US	
2009	Scancode Systems	Parcel and LTL shipping software	Canada	
2010	Porthus	Global trade management software	Belgium	
2010	Imanet	On-demand Canadian customs filing software	Canada	
2010	Routing International	Route planning software	Belgium	
2011	Telargo Inc.	Fleet telematics data gathering software and services	US/Slovenia/Hong Kong	
2011	IntercommIT	Electronic exchange of trade data	Netherlands	
2012	GeoMicro	Vehicle routing and navigation technology	US	
2012	Infodis	Transportation management SaaS	Netherlands	
2012	Integrated Export Systems (IES) Ltd.	Logistics SaaS	US/Hong Kong	
2012	Exentra	EU driver compliance SaaS	UK	
2013	KSD Software Norway	Electronic customs filing software for the EU	Norway	
2013	Impatex Freight Software	Electronic customs filing and freight forwarding software	UK	
2013	Compudata	Supply chain integration and e-invoicing software	Switzerland	
2014	Computer Management	Security information filing services and air cargo management software	US	
2014	Customs Info	Trade data and research tools	US	
2014	Airclic	Mobile logistics automation software	US	
2014	Pentant	Customs connectivity and import/export software	UK	
2014	e-customs	Electronic security and customs filing software	UK	
2015	MK Data Services	Denied party screening data and software	US	
2015	BearWare	Mobile carton tracking technology for retailers	US	
2015	Oz Development	Logistics automation software for SMEs	US	
2016	Pixi Software	e-Commerce order fulfillment and warehouse management software	Germany	
2016	Appterra	Business-to-business supply chain SaaS	US	
2016	4Solutions	Cloud-based supply chain integration	Australia	
2016	Datamyne Inc.	Cloud-based trade data	US	
2017	ShipRush	e-Commerce shipping software for parcels, LTL and FTL	US	
2017	PCSTrac	Shipment tracking software for retailers	US	
2017	MacroPoint	Freight tracking technology	US	
2018	Aljex Software	Cloud-based transportation management	US	
2018	Velocity Mail	Shipment tracking service for airlines	US	
2018	PinPoint GPS Solutions Inc.	Fleet tracking/mobile workforce technology	Canada	
2019	Visual Compliance	Restricted and denied party screening	US	
2019	Core Transport Technologies NX Limited	Accurate tracking of international mail, parcel, and cargo shipments	New Zealand	
2019	STEPcom	Business-to-Business supply chain integration network	Switzerland	
2019	BestTransport	Transportation management system provider	US	
2020	Peoplevox	Cloud-Based eCommerce WMS	UK	
2020	Kontainers	Logistics SaaS	UK	
2020	ShipTrack	Cloud-Based Logistics platform for Final-Mile Deliveries	Canada	
2021	QuestaWeb	A leading provider of foreign trade zone (FTZ) and customs compliance solutions	US	
2021	Portrix Logistic Software	Streamlines and automates complex global shipping rate management processes	Germany	
2021	GreenMile	Cloud-based mobile route execution solutions for food, beverage, and broader distribution verticals	US	
2022	XPS Technologies	Provides cloud-based multi-carrier parcel shipping software for eCommerce shippers and logistics providers	US	
2022	NetCHB	Cloud-based platform to streamline and automate customs filing processes in the US	US	
2022	Foxtrot Systems	Provides machine learning-based mobile route execution software to reduce last-mile costs and improve efficiency	US	
2023	Supply Vision	Provides modular shipment management software helping logistics providers digitize operations from quote to final delivery	US	
2023	GroundCloud	Cloud-based provider of final-mile carrier solutions and road safety compliance tools	US	
2023	Localz	Provides real-time delivery tracking, customer communication, and click-and-collect solutions to enhance experiences	Australia	
2024	OCR Services, Inc.	Provides export compliance software and data for screening, licensing, and product classification in global trade	US	
2024	Aerospace Software Developments (ASD)	Provides customs declaration software and RFID tracking solutions for logistics providers, shippers, and airlines	Ireland	
2024	BoxTop Technologies	UK-based shipment management provider	UK	
2024	MyCarrierPortal	Onboarding platform that screens, verifies, and monitors truck carriers for compliance, legitimacy, and safety	US	
2024	Sellercloud	US-based multi-channel e-commerce inventory and order management	US	
2025	3GTMS	US-based transportation management system (TMS) for shippers, brokers, 3PLs	US	
2025	PackageRoute	US-based all-in-one last mile delivery solution	US	
2025	Finale Inventory	Cloud-based inventory management software	US	

== Services and solutions ==
Descartes has expanded into various solution markets and sectors through acquisitions and product development.

=== Transportation Management ===
Descartes’ Transportation Management solution offers a platform that shippers, freight brokers, and 3PLs can use to synchronize transportation processes and optimize the flow of goods with multimodal TMS, real-time visibility, dock scheduling, and carrier connectivity solutions.

=== Routing, Mobile and Telematics Software ===
Fleet Management is designed to enhance fleet productivity, optimize performance management, ensure safety, and elevate service levels. Descartes's solutions include Fleet Mobile Applications, Customer Engagement Software, Route Planning, Optimization & Dispatch.

=== Global Trade Intelligence ===
Descartes also provides trade intelligence solutions for compliance, enablement, and analytics. These include tools for managing export controls, sanctions, import classifications, tariffs, Free Trade Agreements (FTAs), and global trade data.

=== Customs and Regulatory Compliance ===
Descartes’ Customs and Regulatory Compliance solution supports cross-border trade with preparation, filing, and visibility solutions for cargo security, customs declarations, and other regulatory mandates through international compliance technology. Some of these solutions include customs declarations, export compliance, and Foreign Trade Zone (FTZ) management.

=== E-Commerce Shipping & Fulfilment Software ===
Descartes offers e-commerce and shipping software that supports D2C/B2C brands, marketplace sellers, 3PLs, and more with unified tools for inventory, orders, warehouse, and shipping management.

=== Broker & Forwarder Enterprise Systems ===
Their Broker & Forwarder Enterprise Systems streamline and operate shipment management, customs compliance, accounting, and customer relationship management. This solution includes a shipment portal, customs compliance, Foreign Trade Zone (FTZ) management, and Digital Rate Management.

=== B2B Connectivity and Messaging ===
Its B2B connectivity and EDI messaging solutions connect hundreds of thousands of parties through the Descartes Global Network, enabling the exchange and transformation of business-critical data. The platform supports a range of electronic document-sharing methods, including EDI, advanced messaging systems, and web-based portal solutions.

=== Global Logistics Network ===
Descartes’ cloud-based logistics messaging system, the Global Logistics Network (GLN), connects more than 26,000 customers and 200,000 connected parties in more than 160 countries, making it one of the world's largest logistics networks. Each year, the GLN carries more than 24 billion messages and manages more than 1 billion shipping routes.

Companies use the network to oversee shipping orders, file customs paperwork, comply with security regulations, share information across international supply chains, and automate logistics processes. In 2015, Descartes signed a deal with German business software giant SAP SE that allows users of SAP's transportation management software to access the GLN.
