= Michael D. Smith (computer scientist) =

American computer scientist

- Title: Professor of Engineering and Applied Sciences

Academic background
- Education: Princeton University (BS); Worcester Polytechnic Institute (MS); Stanford University (PhD)
- Thesis: Support for Speculative Execution in High-Performance Processors (1992)
- Doctoral advisor: Mark Horowitz and Monica S. Lam

Academic work
- Discipline: Computer scientist
- Institutions: Harvard University

Dean of the Harvard Faculty of Arts and Sciences
- In office July 2007 – August 2018
- Preceded by: Jeremy R. Knowles
- Succeeded by: Claudine Gay

Interim Dean of the Harvard John A. Paulson School of Engineering and Applied Sciences
- Incumbent
- Assumed office July 2023
- Preceded by: Francis J. Doyle III
- Website: scholar.harvard.edu/mikesmith

Michael David Smith is a professor at the School of Engineering and Applied Sciences of Harvard University and has been serving as the school's interim dean since 2023. Smith's titles within Harvard include John H. Finley, Jr. Professor of Engineering and Applied Sciences and Distinguished Service Professor. Smith's previous appointments as an academic administrator include service as dean of the Harvard Faculty of Arts and Sciences.

== Education ==
Smith graduated from the Peddie School in 1979. He received his Bachelor of Science degree in electrical engineering and computer science from Princeton University in 1983, his Master of Science from Worcester Polytechnic Institute in 1985, and his Doctor of Philosophy in electrical engineering from Stanford University in 1993. His doctoral thesis, Support for Speculative Execution in High-Performance Processors, was published as a technical report in 1992; his advisor was Mark Horowitz, and additional advising was provided by Monica S. Lam.

== Career ==
From 1989 to 1992, Smith worked as a teaching and research assistant at Stanford University. He became an instructor at Harvard in 1992, received successive promotions, and taught the course CS50 from 2002 to 2006. In 2007, while serving as the associate dean for computer science and engineering, Smith was appointed Dean of the Faculty of Arts and Sciences, effective July 2007. During his tenure as dean, he was described as taking a "hands-off approach" to a wave of cheating in CS50. Smith was described in a 2013 feature in The Harvard Gazette as "a remarkably adept problem solver in navigating FAS through the financial crisis." He announced that he was stepping down from the role in March 2018, and served until August of that year. Smith was appointed to a new role in July 2023 as Interim Dean of the School of Engineering and Applied Sciences. He also serves as a faculty athletics representative for the Harvard Crimson.
