= Airclic =

- Type: Private
- Industry: Web-based software
- Founded: 2000
- Headquarters: Trevose, Pennsylvania, USA
- Key people: Rick Pontin, CEO
- Website: www.airclic.com

Airclic is a web-based software and mobile information services company founded in 2000. Airclic offers fully hosted solutions including a workflow-based mobile application framework.

== History ==
Airclic was founded in 2000. The company has gone through several shifts in strategic direction. It originally planned to use its technology to enable consumers with specially equipped mobile phones and handheld devices to scan bar codes in print ads and posters to get information and make purchases. Its proprietary bar codes were called “Scanlets.”

In its early days, the company announced ambitious partnerships with a variety of companies. At one point Motorola, Symbol Technologies, Connect Things and Airclic announced they would invest $500 million “to form a new company that will drive e-commerce growth through one-scan access to the Internet.” A partnership with R.R. Donnelly & Sons, announced in June 2001, was to incorporate Airclic technology into phone books. Another involving HometownGrocers.com (February 2002) would have let grocery store customers use personal scanners to create grocery lists and download nutritional information about food products.

After the Internet bubble burst the company regrouped, gradually shifting to its current focus on automating mobile and field processes for businesses. Its solutions still rely on bar codes and scanner-equipped mobile phones. Philadelphia Business Journal reports that "Airclic has grown its revenue tenfold over the past three years, from $1 million in 2004 to nearly $10 million last year [2007]."

Until early 2010, the company was headquartered in Trevose, Pennsylvania, with operations in Bloomington, Minnesota. With the appointment of Rick Pontin as CEO in April 2010 the Bloomington office was closed and all operations were relocated to the headquarters location.

On July 13, 2010, Airclic announced it had merged with AirVersent, an $8.1 million company based in Owings Mills, Maryland. The Baltimore Sun reported the merger would create "a profitable company with revenue of $22 million a year."

On November 20, 2014, Airclic announced that it was acquired by Descartes Systems Group (TSX:DSG) for $29.7 mm

=== Funding ===
It is unclear how much funding privately owned Airclic has received over the years, but news accounts and the company’s own communications would seem to put the figure at at least $340 million:

- March 2000: (1st round): $15 million from Blue Capital Management, Edgewater, private investors and Forrest, Binkley and Brown
- January 2001: (2nd round): $290 million from a group of investors including Motorola, Ericsson Business Innovation AB, Symbol Technologies Inc., and a private investor group led by Goldman Sachs
- June 2005: $2 million, Zon Capital Partners
- March 2006: $2.86 million, Motorola, Zon Capital Partners, and others
- February 2007: $12.5 million, JMI Equity, Motorola, and Zon Capital Partners
- June 2010: $17.97 million, Crestview Partners, JMI Equity, New Venture Partners, Zon Capital Partners and a handful of officers and board members.

The company also announced an investment in November 2004 from Motorola and "several individual investors." The amount was not disclosed.

=== Management ===
Airclic has had a series of management shakeups since its founding. In March 2000, it announced a “management coup” in the appointment of David Klatt as CEO and Patrick Robinson as CFO. Both were former Black & Decker Corp. executives. Airclic’s chairman at the time was co-founder Peter Ritz. In August, the company announced “the appointment of a stellar management team”—nine people in all.

Months later, Klatt was lured away to become president of Rubbermaid. Wireless Week announced Airclic had hit the “management jackpot” when former American Express CEO Harvey Golub was named chairman and Phillip Reise, the former president of the American Express consumer card services group, was named CEO.

Also in January 2001, Suren Gupta, an IT executive at GMAC Residential, was appointed head of global operation and information services.

Tim Bradley, a former sales executive with Cognos and Adaytum, was named CEO in March 2005. Several other Cognos and Adaytum alumni filled out the management and sales ranks until another round of management changes in early 2010. In April 2010 the company announced the appointment of Rick Pontin as CEO. Previously, Pontin was executive chairman of Tangoe and CEO of its predecessor company TRAQ Wireless.

== Products ==
Like its management team, Airclic's product lineup has undergone numerous transformations over the years. The company's current product line is called Perform.
