= Match rating approach =

Phonetic algorithm

The match rating approach (MRA) is a phonetic algorithm for indexing of words by their pronunciation developed by Western Airlines in 1977 for the indexation and comparison of homophonous names.

The algorithm itself has a simple set of encoding rules but a more lengthy set of comparison rules. The main mechanism is the similarity comparison, which calculates the number of unmatched characters by comparing the strings from left to right and then from right to left, and removing identical characters. This value is subtracted from 6 and then compared to a minimum threshold. The minimum threshold is defined in table A and is dependent upon the length of the strings.

The encoded name is known (perhaps incorrectly) as a personal numeric identifier (PNI). The encoded name can never contain more than 6 alpha only characters.

The match rating approach performs well with names containing the letter "y", unlike the original flavor of the NYSIIS algorithm; for example, the surnames "Smith" and "Smyth" are successfully matched. However, MRA does not perform well with encoded names that differ in length by more than 2.

== Encoding rules ==
1. Delete all vowels unless the vowel begins the word
2. Remove the second consonant of any double consonants present
3. Reduce codex to 6 letters by joining the first 3 and last 3 letters only

== Comparison rules ==
In this section, the words "string(s)" and "name(s)" mean "encoded string(s)" and "encoded name(s)".

1. If the length difference between the encoded strings is 3 or greater, then no similarity comparison is done.
2. Obtain the minimum rating value by calculating the length sum of the encoded strings and using table A.
3. Process the encoded strings from left to right and remove any identical characters found from both strings respectively.
4. Process the unmatched characters from right to left and remove any identical characters found from both names respectively.
5. Subtract the number of unmatched characters from 6 in the longer string. This is the similarity rating.
6. If the similarity rating is equal to or greater than the minimum rating, then the match is considered good.

== Minimum threshold ==
The following table shows the mapping between the minimum rating and the string lengths.

Table A
Sum of Lengths	Minimum Rating
≤ 4	5
4 < sum ≤ 7	4
7 < sum ≤ 11	3
= 12	2

== Match rating approach examples ==
The table below displays the output of the match rating approach algorithm for some common homophonous names.

Name	MRA Codex	Minimum Rating	Similarity Comparison Rating
Byrne	BYRN	4	5
Boern	BRN	4	5
Smith	SMTH	3	5
Smyth	SMYTH	3	5
Catherine	CTHRN	3	4
Kathryn	KTHRYN	3	4

== See also ==
- Soundex
