= Flud =

Social news reader application

Flud was a social news reader application released in 2010 for iPad, iPhone, Android and Windows Phone. It was designed to display RSS feeds from blogs and news sites into individual streams for easy viewing. In Flud, articles and stories could be stored for later reading with the Reading List, shared as a favorite read with the Flud button, and shared with Facebook, Twitter, email, Tumblr, Instapaper, and ReadItLater. Flud was headquartered in the historic Spreckels Theater Building in San Diego, California, with remote offices in Detroit and Chicago.

Flud had been tagged as "the first true social news reader" where users could create a personal profile, follow others who share their interests, and become influencers to their followers by sharing content (known as Fluding).

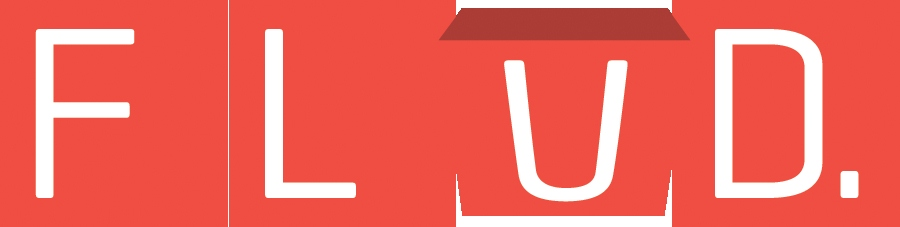
Flud logo

On August 8, 2013, Flud was discontinued.

== History ==
Flud started as a "secret sauce" project in the summer of 2010 between Bobby Ghoshal and Matthew Ausonio of San Diego, California. Flud 1.0 for the iPad was released on the App Store in August 2010, and became available for the iPhone in the following months.

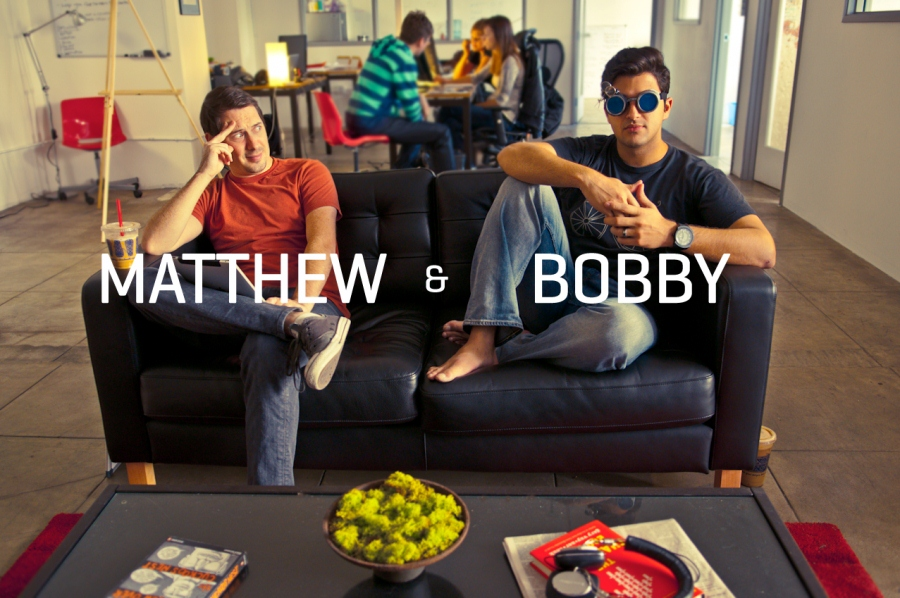
The Flud team at HQ in San Diego, CA

Soon after the initial launch of Flud 1.0, Fast Company distinguished Flud's iPad user interface as the "Best UI Design of 2010", NBC called Flud the "future of news" and Mashable distinguished Flud as one of three news readers actively changing and innovating the news industry.

Flud received $1 million in seed funding in April 2011 and became available on Android mobile devices in August 2011.

In December 2011, Flud 2.0 was released, allowing users to create their own "news personalities" and become a trusted source on topical interests. Flud 2.0 launched on Windows Phone and Android devices in March 2012.

On August 8, 2013, the Flud service was discontinued. Users had until that date to download all their data.
