= Data efficiency =

Data efficiency refers to efficiency of the many processes that can be applied to data such as storage, access, filtering, sharing, etc., and whether or not the processes lead to the desired outcome within resource constraints.

A management definition of data efficiency would be the measure of how data storage and usage across an enterprise or within a department or within a project - impacts the organization's costs and revenues.

On the broadest level:

DE = expected benefits from applying I.T. to a given task / cost of application of I.T.

On the technical side, in the development of computer hardware, software and systems, Data Efficiency can refer to many things such as packing bits on a physical medium^{1}, or chip area usage on a silicon wafer^{2}, or the use of data in programming so as to require less time and computation resources^{3}.

Examples of these two categories of use for data efficiency (managerial and technical) can be found in process industries and computer chip research and development:

1.Traditional water/wastewater management procedures include travel to pump stations, reading and hand recording of meter numbers, transposition of log sheets, and other manual operations. This whole process can be said to have low data efficiency^{4}.

2.In the design of today’s Dynamic Random-Access Memory (DRAM) computer chips, R&D optimizes parameters such as row and column access times, chip area usage, burst length and row granularity. Input/output times are measured in very small fractions of a second. The latest versions of these chips are said to have high data efficiency^{2}.

Both these examples above show the application of different information technologies that process data to reach a defined outcome. Sometimes processes are within time, space and resource constraints, and sometimes they are not.
