= Soundex =

Phonetic algorithm for indexing names by sound

Soundex is a phonetic algorithm for indexing names by sound, as pronounced in English. The goal is for homophones to be encoded to the same representation so that they can be matched despite minor differences in spelling. The algorithm mainly encodes consonants; a vowel will not be encoded unless it is the first letter. Soundex is the most widely known of all phonetic algorithms (in part because it is a standard feature of popular database software such as IBM Db2, PostgreSQL, MySQL, SQLite, Ingres, MS SQL Server, Oracle, ClickHouse, Snowflake and SAP ASE.) Improvements to Soundex are the basis for many modern phonetic algorithms.

== History ==
Soundex was developed by Robert C. Russell and Margaret King Odell and patented in 1918 and 1922.

The SOUNDEX trademark (USPTO Serial No. 71246709) was filed on March 31, 1927, by Rand Kardex Bureau, Inc., covering index cards and forms for phonetic indexing systems.

A variation, American Soundex, was used in the 1930s for a retrospective analysis of the US censuses from 1890 through 1920. The Soundex code came to prominence in the 1960s when it was the subject of several articles in the Communications and Journal of the Association for Computing Machinery, and especially when described in Donald Knuth's The Art of Computer Programming.

The National Archives and Records Administration (NARA) maintains the current rule set for the official implementation of Soundex used by the U.S. government. These encoding rules are available from NARA, upon request, in the form of General Information Leaflet 55, "Using the Census Soundex".

== American Soundex ==
The Soundex code for a name consists of a letter followed by three numerical digits: the letter is the first letter of the name, and the digits encode the remaining consonants. Consonants at a similar place of articulation share the same digit so, for example, the labial consonants B, F, P, and V are each encoded as the number 1.

The correct value can be found as follows:

1. Retain the first letter of the name and drop all other occurrences of a, e, i, o, u, y, h, w.
2. Replace consonants with digits as follows (after the first letter):
  - b, f, p, v → 1
  - c, g, j, k, q, s, x, z → 2
  - d, t → 3
  - l → 4
  - m, n → 5
  - r → 6
3. If two or more letters with the same number are adjacent in the original name (before step 1), only retain the first letter; also two letters with the same number separated by 'h', 'w' or 'y' are coded as a single number, whereas such letters separated by a vowel are coded twice. This rule also applies to the first letter.
4. If there are too few letters in the word to assign three numbers, append zeros until there are three numbers. If there are four or more numbers, retain only the first three.

Using this algorithm, both "Robert" and "Rupert" return the same string "R163" while "Rubin" yields "R150". "Ashcraft" and "Ashcroft" both yield "A261". "Tymczak" yields "T522" not "T520" (the chars 'z' and 'k' in the name are coded as 2 twice since a vowel lies in between them). "Pfister" yields "P236" not "P123" (the first two letters have the same number and are coded once as 'P'), and "Honeyman" yields "H555".

The following algorithm is followed by most SQL languages (excluding PostgreSQL):

1. Save the first letter. Map all occurrences of a, e, i, o, u, y, h, w. to zero(0)
2. Replace all consonants (include the first letter) with digits as in [2.] above.
3. Replace all adjacent same digits with one digit, and then remove all the zero (0) digits
4. If the saved letter's digit is the same as the resulting first digit, remove the digit (keep the letter).
5. Append 3 zeros if result contains less than 3 digits. Remove all except the first letter and 3 digits after it (This step is the same as [4.] in explanation above).

The two algorithms above do not return the same results in all cases primarily because of the difference between when the vowels are removed. The first algorithm is used by most programming languages and the second is used by SQL. For example, "Tymczak" yields "T522" in the first algorithm, but "T520" in the algorithm used by SQL. Often, both algorithms generate the same code. As examples, both "Robert" and "Rupert" yield "R163" and "Honeyman" yields "H555". In designing an application, which combines SQL and a programming language, the architect must decide whether to do all of the Soundex encoding in the SQL server or all in the programming language. The MySQL implementation can return more than 4 characters.

== Variants ==
A similar algorithm called "Reverse Soundex" prefixes the last letter of the name instead of the first.

The New York State Identification and Intelligence System (NYSIIS) algorithm was introduced in 1970 as an improvement to the Soundex algorithm. NYSIIS handles some multi-character n-grams and maintains relative vowel positioning, whereas Soundex does not.

Daitch–Mokotoff Soundex (D–M Soundex) was developed in 1985 by genealogist Gary Mokotoff and later improved by genealogist Randy Daitch because of problems they encountered while trying to apply the Russell Soundex to Jews with Germanic or Slavic surnames (such as Moskowitz vs. Moskovitz or Levine vs. Lewin). D–M Soundex is sometimes referred to as "Jewish Soundex" or "Eastern European Soundex", although the authors discourage the use of those names. The D–M Soundex algorithm can return as many as 32 individual phonetic encodings for a single name. Results of D–M Soundex are returned in an all-numeric format between 100000 and 999999. This algorithm is much more complex than Russell Soundex.

As a response to deficiencies in the Soundex algorithm, Lawrence Philips developed the Metaphone algorithm in 1990. Philips developed an improvement to Metaphone in 2000, which he called Double Metaphone. Double Metaphone includes a much larger encoding rule set than its predecessor, handles a subset of non-Latin characters, and returns a primary and a secondary encoding to account for different pronunciations of a single word in English. Philips created Metaphone 3 as a further revision in 2009 to provide a professional version that provides a much higher percentage of correct encodings for English words, non-English words familiar to Americans, and first and last names found in the United States. It also provides settings that allow more exact consonant and internal vowel matching to allow the programmer to focus the precision of matches more closely.

== See also ==
- Cologne phonetics
- Match Rating Approach
- Levenshtein distance
