= Track (moving medium) =

Path on a recording medium

A track is a path on a recording medium. There are some variations in nomenclature; for some media, a track is a logical (content-based) path and for others, it is based on the geometry of the medium. The term is not used for punched cards.

== Content-based tracks ==
The terms session, title, or track may be used, depending on the medium.

=== LP ===
A track on a long-playing record (LP) is a segment of the spiral groove recording a single movement, song or other work. Usually, unrecorded sections of the groove guide the tone arm between consecutive tracks. However, occasionally - for example, on some language learning records - the tracks are not connected, and the tone arm must be moved manually to the next track's lead-in groove.

=== Optical disks ===
A track, session, or title on an audio-video optical disk is a segment recording a single movement, song, or other work.

== Geometry-based tracks ==
On some devices, a track is defined based on the geometry of the medium, typically running for the full length or circumference.

=== Linear ===
On magnetic cards, magnetic strips, and tape, tracks normally (Note: But see Helical scan.) run the full length of the medium. Some devices record multiple tracks in parallel either to improve speed or to provide separate channels for, e.g., stereophonic sound.

==== Punched tape ====
On Punched tape, also known as paper (Note: The term paper tape was often used to refer to perforated Mylar tape.) tape, a track runs the length of the tape, and all tracks are recorded in parallel. References to the number of tracks sometimes use the words channel or level. Five-level tape is used for Baudot, eight-level for ASCII, and twelve level for carriage control tapes.

==== Magnetic tape reels and cartridges ====
On analog audio tape, a track runs the length of the tape and typically contains a single channel; stereophonic and quadraphonic recordings use multiple tracks.

On digital tape, a track runs the length of the tape; typically, all tracks are written and read in parallel.

==== Magnetic cards and strips ====
On magnetic cards (Note: Not to be confused with magnetic stripes on, e.g., credit cards.) and magnetic strips used as storage media, a track runs the length of the card or strip; typically, multiple tracks are written and read in parallel and considered to be a single logical track.

The NCR CRAM, RCA Model 3488 Random Access Computer Equipment, and RCA 70/568-11 Mass Storage Unit used magnetic cards in a magazine (deck for CRAM).

The IBM 2321 Data Cell used magnetic strips in a cell and a subcell. The tracks had variable-length count key data (CKD) records.

==== Magnetic stripe cards ====
Magnetic stripe cards are commonly used as credit cards, identity cards, and transportation tickets. Standardized cards contain up to three parallel tracks. Unusually, two different recording densities are used (210 and 75 bits per

=== Helical scan ===
On some videotape and magnetic tape media, a read/write head moves across the width of the tape while the tape is moving, providing a diagonal Helical scan. An example is the IBM 3850 Mass Storage System (MSS).

=== Rotating ===
A track (Note: Sometimes called a band.) on a rotating magnetic disk or drum normally (Note: The RCA Data Record File (DRF) used a spiral track.) runs for the circumference of the medium. All tracks on a magnetic drum have the same capacity.

Early rotating drives recorded bits at a constant angular density, and all tracks had the same data capacity. On all contemporary disk drives, a track contains fixed-length sectors. However, some older disks and drums recorded variable length records, and the DASD subsystems supported for general use by IBM's flagship operating systems simulate the Count Key Data (CKD) organization.

The first disk drive, the 1957 IBM 350 disk storage, had ten 100-character sectors per track; the tracks on contemporary disk drives are substantially larger.

In the early days of the industry sectors were referred to by several other names.

==== Drums ====
All tracks on a rotating drum have the same data capacity. Early drums were used for main memory, and tracks were divided into fixed-length words, typically 36 bits for use on binary computers and ten digits plus sign for use on decimal computers. Drums used for auxiliary storage typically had fixed-length sectors, but the IBM 7320 on the IBM 7090 and 7094 had variable-length records controlled by a format track and the IBM 2301, 2303, and 7320 on the S/360 had variable length CKD records.

==== Disks ====
The first disk drive, the 1957 IBM 350 disk storage, had ten 100-character sectors per track and recorded at a constant angular density; the tracks on contemporary disk drives are substantially larger and are recorded at a constant linear density, so that outer tracks contain more data than inner tracks. Most of the industry designed disk drives with fixed-length sectors; the IBM 1301 and IBM 1302 on the 7000 series had variable length records controlled by format tracks, and all DASD on S/360 had variable length CKD records. Although IBM supports FBA and SCSI disk drives on IBM Z, its flagship z/OS operating system only has limited support for SCSI drives and requires CKD drives for most functions.

=== Virtual Geometry ===
Starting with the 3350, IBM offered disc drives with new geometries that could present the appearance of older disk drives. At the present time, almost all IBM mainframes use DASD subsystems that look like 3390 drives but use SCSI disks and SSDs to actually store the data.
