= Storage Module Device =

Family of computer storage devices

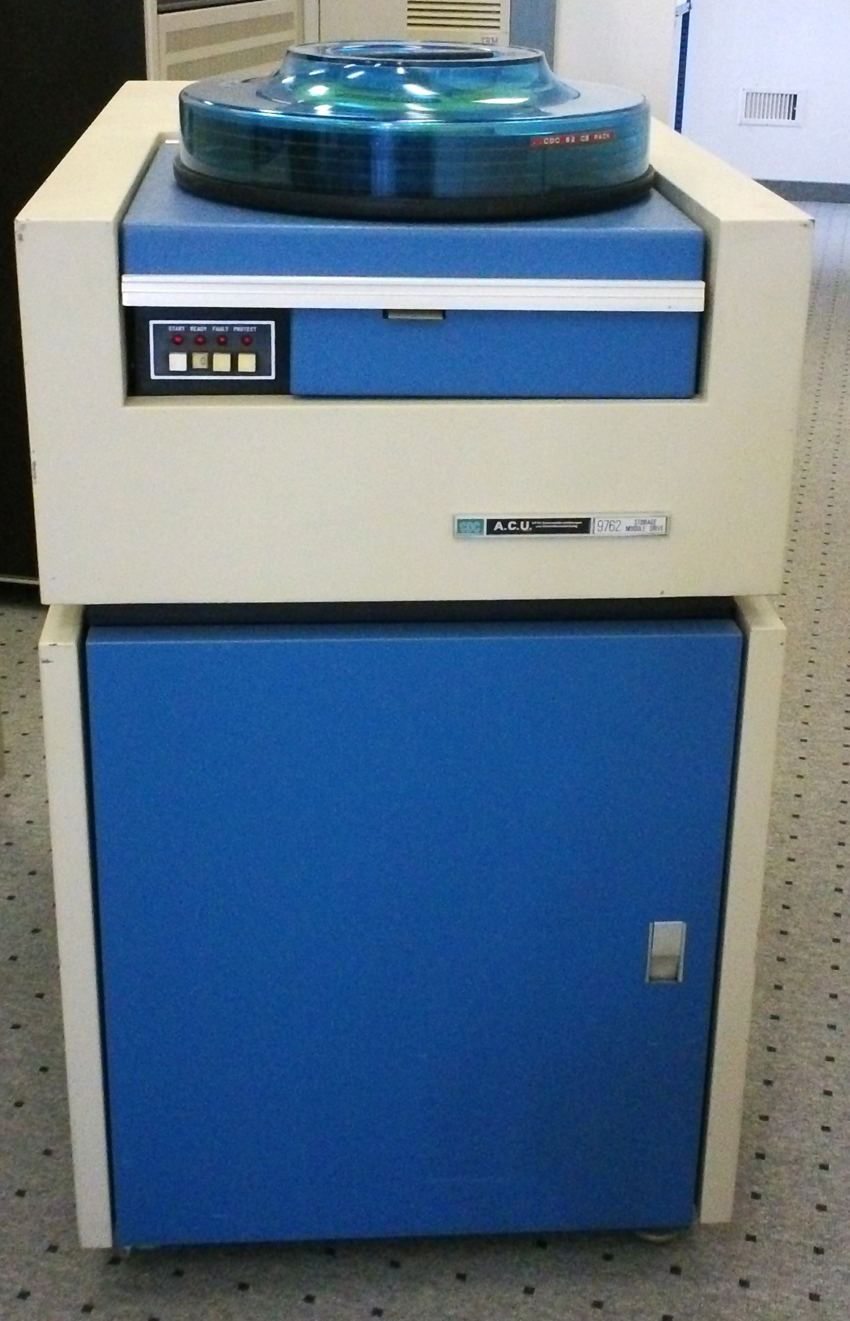
CDC9762-smd-drive

Storage Module Device (SMD) is a family of storage devices (hard disk drives) that were first shipped by Control Data Corporation in December 1973 as the CDC 9760 40 MB (unformatted) storage module disk drive. The CDC 9762 80 MB variant was announced in June 1974 and the CDC 9764 150 MB and the CDC 9766 300 MB variants were announced in 1975 (all capacities unformatted). A non-removable media variant family of 12, 24 and 48 MB capacity, the MMD, was then announced in 1976. This family's interface, SMD, derived from the earlier Digital RP0x interface, was documented as ANSI Standard X3.91M - 1982, Storage Module Interfaces with Extensions for Enhanced Storage Module Interfaces.

The SMD interface is based upon a definition of two flat interface cables ("A" control and "B" data) which run from the disk drive to a hard disk drive interface and then to a computer. This interface allows data to be transferred at 9.6 Mbit/s. The SMD interface was supported by many 8 inch and 14 inch removable and non-removable disk drives. It was mainly implemented on disk drives used with mainframes and minicomputers and was later itself replaced by SCSI.

Until the Intelligent Peripheral Interface, SMD was the standard hard disk interface for large-capacity and large-diameter drives. It was rarely used with microcomputers, except sometimes in large file servers. Control Data shipped its 100,000th SMD drive in July 1981. By 1983 at least 25 manufacturers had supplied SMD drives, including, Ampex, Century Data Systems, CDC, Fujitsu, Hitachi, Micropolis, Pertec, Priam, NEC and Toshiba.

== CDC 976x disk geometry ==
The CDC 9762 80 MB variant has 5 × 14" platters. The top and bottom platters are guard platters and not used for storage. The top and bottom guard platters are exactly the same size as the data platters, and are usually made from a data platter which had too many errors to be usable as a data platter. The remaining 3 platters give 5 data surfaces and one servo surface for head positioning, being the upper surface of the center platter.

The CDC 9766 300 MB variant has 12 × 14" platters. Again the top and bottom platters are guard platters and not used for storage. The remaining 10 platters give 19 data surfaces and one servo surface for head positioning, again being the upper surface of the center platter.

Common to both the 80 MB and 300 MB disks, they have 823 cylinders and the servo surface is on one of the central platters. The sector size and sectors per track depend on how the disk is initialized. For example on the GEC 4000 series minicomputers a configuration of 34 sectors of 512 data bytes each per track is used.

SMD disk packs (as the Storage Module itself was most commonly called) required head alignment to assure interchangeability of media between drives.
