= Hard disk drive interface =

Computer bus used for data storage systems

Hard disk drives are accessed over one of a number of bus types, including parallel ATA (PATA, also called IDE or EIDE; described before the introduction of SATA as ATA), Serial ATA (SATA), SCSI, Serial Attached SCSI (SAS), and Fibre Channel. Bridge circuitry is sometimes used to connect hard disk drives to buses with which they cannot communicate natively, such as IEEE 1394, USB, SCSI, NVMe and Thunderbolt.

== Disk interface families ==
Disk drive interfaces have evolved from simple interfaces requiring complex controllers to attach to a computer into high level interfaces that present a consistent interface to a computer system regardless of the internal technology of the hard disk drive. The following table lists some common HDD interfaces in chronological order:

Acronym or abbreviation	Meaning	Description
SMD	Storage Module Device	Bit serial data interface introduced by CDC. Standard interface for many mini-computers in the 1970s and 1980s.
SASI	Shugart Associates System Interface	Word serial interface introduced by Shugart Associates circa 1978; Evolved by ANSI into SCSI (SASI is a compatible subset of the first version of SCSI).
ST-506; ST-412; ST-412RLL		Bit serial data interfaces introduced by Seagate Technology beginning 1980. Standard interfaces for most small HDDs in the 1980s and early 1990s.
SCSI	Small Computer System Interface	Word serial interface sponsored by ANSI and introduced in mid 1980s; Standard interfaces for most enterprise HDDs in this century; superseded by SAS
ESDI	Enhanced Small Disk Interface	Bit serial data interface sponsored by ANSI and first introduced by Maxtor in late 1980s. A higher data rate follow on to the ST-506 family into the mid-1990s, superseded by SCSI
(P)ATA; IDE	(Parallel) AT Attachment; Integrated Drive Electronics	Word serial interface introduced in late 1980s by Conner Peripherals, later sponsored by ANSI; successor to ST-412/506/ESDI. Standard HDD interface on all but enterprise HDDs until superseded by SATA
SATA	Serial ATA	Bit serial interface successor to PATA sponsored by ANSI and introduced in 2003. Most common interface for all but enterprise HDDs.
SAS	Serial Attached SCSI	Bit serial interface successor to SCSI sponsored by ANSI and introduced in 2004. Most common interface for enterprise HDDs.

== Early interfaces ==
A data cable (top) and control cable (below) connecting a controller card and an ST-506 type HDD. Power cable not shown.

The earliest hard disk drive (HDD) interfaces were bit serial data interfaces that connected an HDD to a controller with two cables, one for control and one for data. (Note: A few HDDs were parallel data transfer device, e.g. IBM 2305.) An additional cable was used for power, initially frequently AC but later usually connected directly to a DC power supply unit. The controller provided significant functions such as serial/parallel conversion, data separation, and track formatting, and required matching to the drive (after formatting) in order to assure reliability. Each control cable could serve two or more drives, while a dedicated (and smaller) data cable served each drive.

Examples of such early interfaces include:

- Many early IBM drives, e.g., IBM 2311, had such an interface.
- The SMD interface was popular on minicomputers in the 1970s.
- ST-506 used MFM (Modified Frequency Modulation) for the data encoding method.
- ST412, an ST-506 variant was available in either MFM or RLL (Run-Length Limited) encoding variants.
- Enhanced Small Disk Interface (ESDI) was an industry standard interface similar to ST412 supporting higher data rates between the processor and the disk drive.

In bit serial data interfaces the data frequency, data encoding scheme as written to the disk surface and error detection all influenced the design of the supporting controller. Encoding schemes used included Frequency Modulation (FM), Modified Frequency Modulation (MFM) and RLL encoding at frequencies for example ranging from 0.156 MHz (FM on 2311) to 7.5 MHz (RLL on ST412) MHz. Thus each time the internal technology advanced there was a necessary delay as controllers were designed or redesigned to accommodate the advancement; this along with the cost of controller development led to the introduction of Word serial interfaces.

Enhanced Small Disk Interface (ESDI) was an attempt to minimize controller design time by supporting multiple data rates with a standard data encoding scheme; this was usually negotiated automatically by the disk drive and controller; most of the time, however, 15 or 20 megabit ESDI disk drives were not downward compatible (i.e. a 15 or 20 megabit disk drive would not run on a 10 megabit controller). ESDI disk drives typically also had jumpers to set the number of sectors per track and (in some cases) sector size.

== Word serial interfaces ==
Historical Word serial interfaces connect a hard disk drive to a bus adapter (Note: Today typically integrated but separate boards or boxes in early embodiments) with one cable for combined data/control. (As for all early interfaces above, each drive also has an additional power cable, usually direct to the power supply unit.) The earliest versions of these interfaces typically had an 8 bit parallel data transfer to/from the drive, but 16-bit versions became much more common, and there are 32 bit versions. The word nature of data transfer makes the design of a host bus adapter significantly simpler than that of the precursor HDD controller.

- CTL-I (Controller Interface) was an 8-bit word serial interface introduced by IBM for its mainframe hard disk drives beginning with the 3333 in 1972. The 3333 was the first unit in a string of up to eight 3330 type hard disk drives; it contained a CTL-I controller and two 3330 type disk drives. Subsequently, the first drive (containing a CTL-I controller) in a string of drives was designated by IBM as an A-unit. The drives within an A-unit and all other drives in a string had interfaces similar to the early interfaces, above. A-units connected to IBM Directors or integrated attachments.
- Small Computer System Interface (SCSI), originally named SASI for Shugart Associates System Interface, is an early (circa 1978) industry standard interface explicitly deployed to minimize system integration efforts. SCSI disks became standard on servers and workstations. Commodore Amiga, and Apple Macintosh deployed SCSI drive through the mid-1990s, by which time most models had been transitioned to ATA (and later, SATA) family disks. Only in 2005 did the capacity of SCSI disks fall behind ATA disk technology, though the highest-performance disks are still available in SCSI, SAS and Fibre Channel only. The range limitations of the data cable allows for external SCSI devices. Originally SCSI data cables used single ended (common mode) data transmission, but server class SCSI could use differential transmission, either low-voltage differential (LVD) or high-voltage differential (HVD). ("Low" and "High" voltages for differential SCSI are relative to SCSI standards and do not meet the meaning of low voltage and high voltage as used in general electrical engineering contexts, as apply e.g. to statutory electrical codes; both LVD and HVD use low voltage signals (3.3 V and 5 V respectively) in general terminology.)

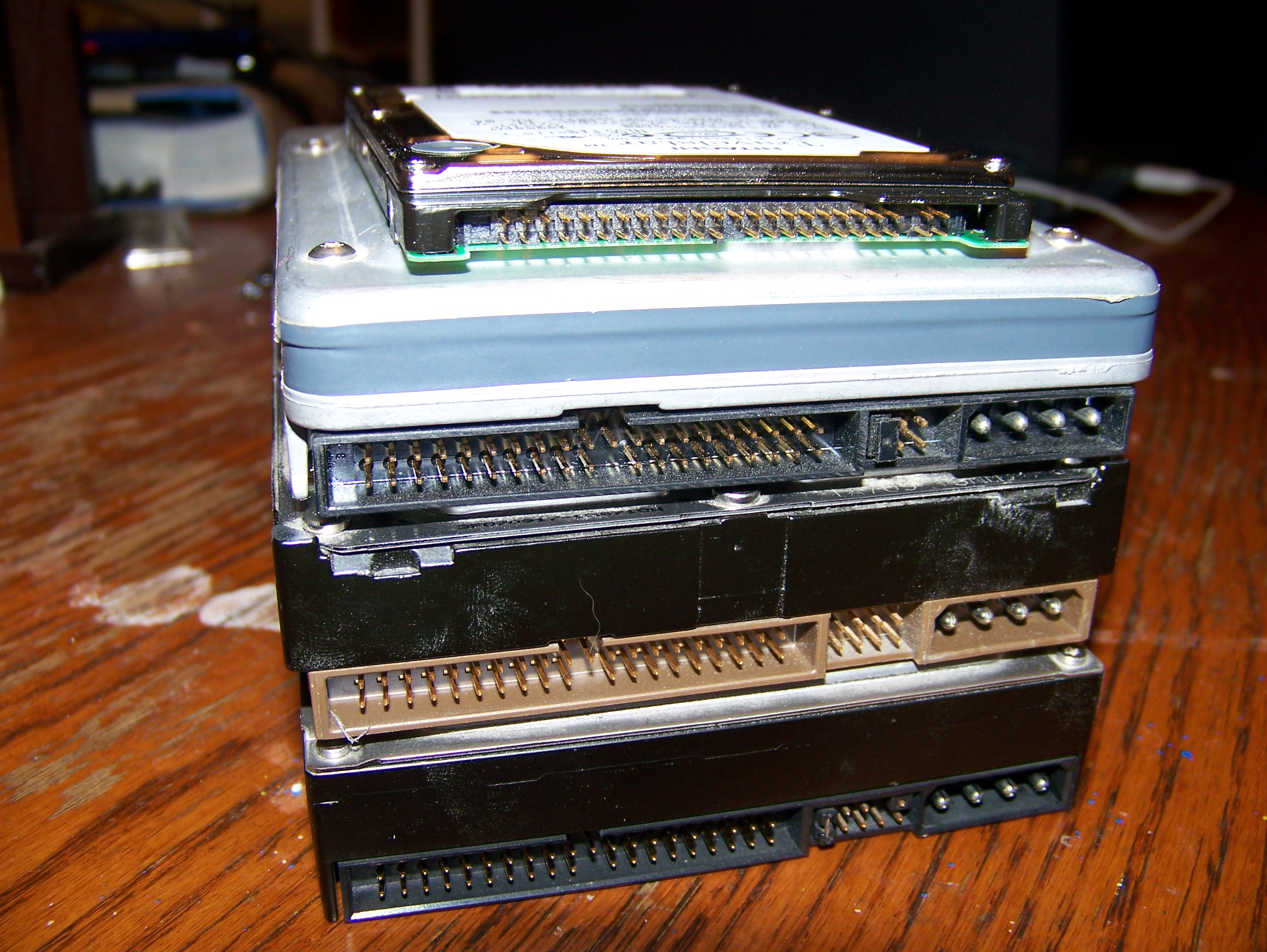
Several Parallel ATA hard disk drives

- Parallel ATA, originally IDE and then standardized under the name AT Attachment (ATA), with the alias P-ATA or PATA retroactively added upon introduction of the new variant Serial ATA. The original name (circa 1986) reflected the integration of the controller with the hard drive itself. (That integration was not new with IDE, having been done a few years earlier with SCSI drives.) Moving the HDD controller from the interface card to the disk drive helped to standardize the host/controller interface, reduce the programming complexity in the host device driver, and reduced system cost and complexity. The 40-pin IDE/ATA connection transfers 16 bits of data at a time on the data cable. The data cable was originally 40-conductor, but later higher speed requirements for data transfer to and from the hard drive led to an "ultra DMA" mode, known as UDMA. Progressively swifter versions of this standard ultimately added the requirement for an 80-conductor variant of the same cable, where half of the conductors provides grounding necessary for enhanced high-speed signal quality by reducing crosstalk. The interface for 80-conductor only has 39 pins, the missing pin acting as a key to prevent incorrect insertion of the connector to an incompatible socket, a common cause of disk and controller damage.

== Bit serial interfaces ==
Modern bit serial interfaces connect a hard disk drive to a host bus interface adapter (today in a PC typically integrated into the "south bridge") with one data/control cable. Each drive also has an additional power cable, usually direct to the power supply unit.

- DECs Standard Disk Interconnect (SDI) was an early example of a modern bit serial interface.
- Fibre Channel (FC) is a successor to parallel SCSI interface on enterprise market. It is a serial protocol. In disk drives usually the Fibre Channel Arbitrated Loop (FC-AL) connection topology is used. FC has much broader usage than mere disk interfaces, and it is the cornerstone of storage area networks (SANs). Recently other protocols for this field, like iSCSI and ATA over Ethernet have been developed as well. Confusingly, drives usually use copper twisted-pair cables for Fibre Channel, not fibre optics. The latter are traditionally reserved for larger devices, such as servers or disk array controllers.

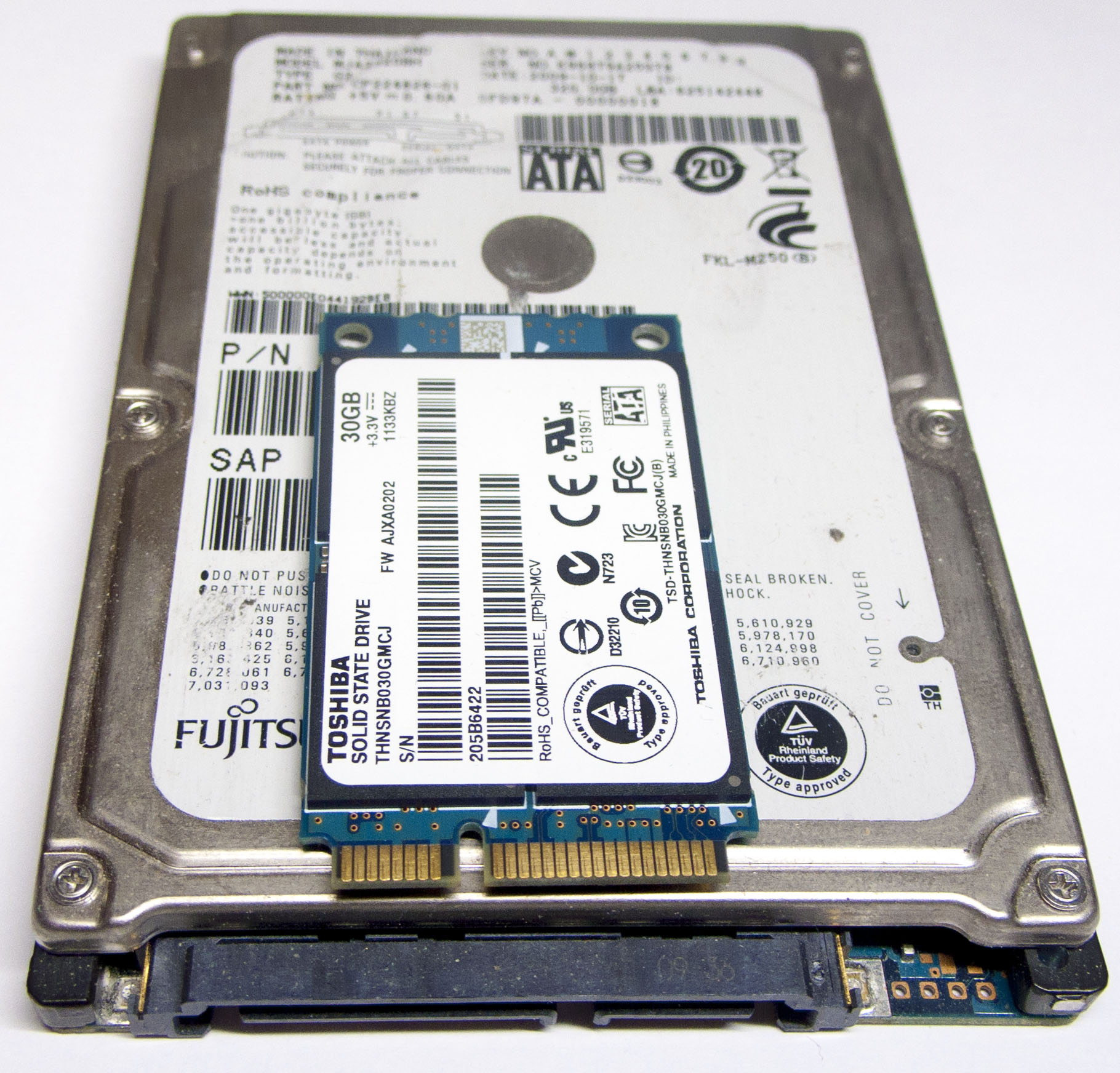
An mSATA SSD on top of a 2.5-inch SATA drive

- Serial ATA (SATA). The SATA data cable has one data pair for differential transmission of data to the device, and one pair for differential receiving from the device, just like EIA-422. That requires that data be transmitted serially. A similar differential signaling system is used in RS485, LocalTalk, USB, FireWire, and differential SCSI.
- Serial Attached SCSI (SAS). The SAS is a new generation serial communication protocol for devices designed to allow for much higher speed data transfers and is compatible with SATA. SAS uses a mechanically identical data and power connector to standard 3.5-inch SATA1/SATA2 HDDs, and many server-oriented SAS RAID controllers are also capable of addressing SATA hard drives. SAS uses serial communication instead of the parallel method found in traditional SCSI devices but still uses SCSI commands.
