= IBM drum storage =

Data-storage devices

In early computers drum storage consisted of a large metal cylinder coated on the outside surface with a ferromagnetic recording material, to provide random access for stored data. Drums were later largely replaced by the hard disk drive.

Drums were used as main memory by IBM in computers including the IBM 305 and IBM 650; IBM also offered drum devices as secondary storage for the 700/7000 series and System/360 series of computers.

== IBM 731 ==
The IBM 731 is a discontinued storage unit used on the IBM 701. It has a storage capacity of 2,048 36-bit words (9,216 8-bit bytes).

== IBM 732 ==
The IBM 732 is a discontinued storage unit used on the IBM 702. It has a storage capacity of 60,000 6-bit characters (45,000 8-bit bytes).

== IBM 733 ==
The IBM 733 is a discontinued storage unit used on the IBM 704 and IBM 709. It has a storage capacity of 8192 36-bit words (36,864 8-bit bytes).

== IBM 734 ==
The IBM 734 is a discontinued storage unit used on the IBM 705 It has a storage capacity of 60,000 6-bit characters (45,000 8-bit bytes).

== IBM 7320 ==
The IBM 7320 is a discontinued storage unit manufactured by IBM which was announced on December 10, 1962 for the IBM 7090 and 7094 computer systems, was retained for the earliest System/360 systems as a count key data device, and was discontinued in 1965. The 7320 is a vertically mounted head-per-track device with 449 tracks, 400 data tracks, 40 alternate tracks, and 9 clock/format tracks. The rotational speed is 3,490 rpm, so the average rotational delay is 8.6 milliseconds.

Attachment to a 709x system is through an IBM 7909 Data Channel and an IBM 7631 File Control unit, which can attach up to five random-access storage units: a mix of 7320, 1301, and 1302 DASD. One or two 7631 controllers can attach to a computer system, but the system can still attach only a total of five DASD. When used with a 709x, a track holds 2,796 6-bit characters, and a 7320 unit holds 1,118,400 characters. (Note: The actual capacity depends on the contents of the format track, but with full track formatting it is 2,796 6-bit characters/track and 1,118,400 characters/unit.) Data transfer rate is 202,800 characters per second.

The 7320 attaches to a System/360 computer through a channel and an IBM 2841 Storage Control unit. Each 2841 can attach up to eight 7320 devices. When used with System/360, a track holds 2,081 8-bit bytes, and a 7320 unit holds 878,000 bytes. Data transfer rate is 135,000 bytes per second.

The 7320 was superseded by the IBM 2301 in mid-1966.

== IBM 2301 ==
The IBM 2301 is a magnetic drum storage device introduced in the late 1960s to "provide large capacity, direct access storage for IBM System/360 Models 65, 67, 75, or 85." The vertically mounted drum rotates at around 3,500 revolutions per minute, and has a head-per-track access mechanism and a capacity of 4 MB. The 2301 has 800 physical tracks; four physical tracks make up one logical track which is read or written as a unit. The 200 logical tracks have 20,483 bytes each. The average access time is 8.6 ms, and the data transfer rate is 1,200,000 bytes per second. The 2301 attaches to a System/360 via a selector channel and an IBM 2820 Storage Control Unit, which can control up to four 2301 units.

== IBM 2303 ==
The IBM 2303 is a magnetic drum storage device with the same physical specifications as the IBM 2301. The difference is that the 2303 reads and writes one physical track at a time, rather than the four in the 2301, reducing the data transfer rate to 312,500 bytes per second. The 2303 attaches to System/360 through a channel and an IBM 2841 Storage Control Unit, which can attach up to two 2303 units.

== See also ==
- Drum memory: Drums used as main memory
