= IBM 2321 Data Cell =

Former direct access storage device

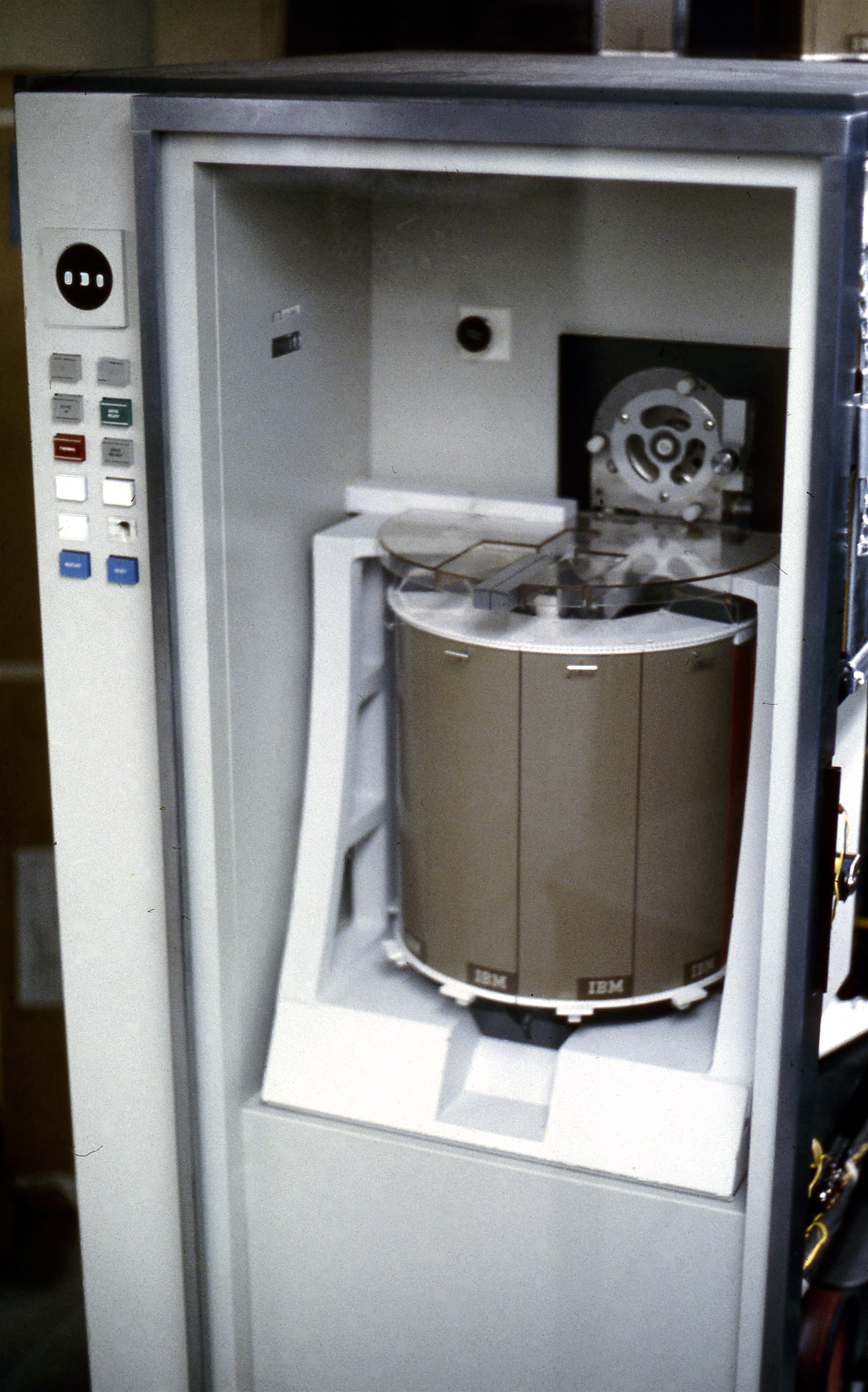
IBM 2321 Data Cell at the University of Michigan Computing Center in the late 1960s

The IBM 2321 Data Cell is a discontinued direct access storage device (DASD) for the IBM System/360, announced along with System/360 in April 1964. It holds up to 400 megabytes of data, with an access time of 95 milliseconds to 600 milliseconds, depending on the addressed strip position and data arrangement in each data cell. Data is stored on short strips of magnetic tape, which gave the system the nickname "noodle picker" due to the strip's resemblance to pasta noodles. The 2321 was withdrawn from marketing in January, 1975.

== Characteristics ==
The 2321 houses up to ten removable and interchangeable data cells, each containing 40 megabytes. Each data cell contains 200 strips of magnetic tape, which are the basic recording media. Strips are 2 1/4 inches (5.7 cm) wide and 13 inches (33 cm) long. The total storage capacity is 400 megabytes or 800 million decimal digits. Up to eight 2321s can be attached to the IBM 2841 Control Unit, allowing an overall capacity of over three GB.

In comparison to the contemporary IBM 2311 Disk Device, the IBM 2321 Data Cell Device holds 55 times more data, while being only seven times slower (85ms and 600ms access times respectively). One fully loaded IBM 2841 Control Unit connected with eight IBM 2321 Data Cell Devices has the capacity of 441 IBM 2311 Disk Devices, which would need to be connected to 56 IBM 2841 Control Units, which would require seven data channels.

The Data Cell makes use of three concurrently operating separate seeking systems: a servo-hydraulic one to rotate the bins to select the proper subcell, and two solenoid driven ones: one to select the correct strip tab of the ten in the subcell, and the other to select one of the five head positions, for the 20 element head (100 tracks per strip). The hydraulic fluid, Mobil DTE Light, a machine tool circulating oil, is pressurized at 1500 psi and despite a lot of folklore about oil leaks, they were very rare. The oil sump holds 5 US gallons (19 L).

Although its storage medium is tape, the 2321 is classified as a direct access storage device which can directly access a record rather than scan all the tape to find a record as would a conventional tape drive. IBM's System/360 channels addressed the 2321 as a direct access storage devices, i.e., a disk drive, with a 6-byte seek address of the form ØBBSCH (hexadecimal) where the first byte is zero and the remaining bytes address the Bin (i.e., cell and sub-cell), Strip, Cylinder and Head.

== See also ==
- NCR CRAM
- Carousel memory
