= History of IBM magnetic disk drives =

IBM manufactured magnetic disk storage devices from 1956 to 2003, when it sold its hard disk drive business to Hitachi. Both the hard disk drive (HDD) and floppy disk drive (FDD) were invented by IBM and as such IBM's employees were responsible for many of the innovations in these products and their technologies. The basic mechanical arrangement of hard disk drives has not changed since the IBM 1301. Disk drive performance and characteristics are measured by the same standards now as they were in the 1950s. Few products in history have enjoyed such spectacular declines in cost and physical size along with equally dramatic improvements in capacity and performance.

IBM manufactured 8-inch floppy disk drives from 1969 until the mid-1980s, but did not become a significant manufacturer of smaller-sized, 5.25- or 3.5-inch floppy disk drives (the dimension refers to the diameter of the floppy disk, not the size of the drive). IBM always offered its magnetic disk drives for sale but did not offer them with original equipment manufacturer (OEM) terms until 1981. By 1996, IBM had stopped making hard disk drives unique to its systems and was offering all its HDDs as an OEM.

IBM uses many terms to describe its various magnetic disk drives, such as direct-access storage device (DASD), (Note: The term DASD encompasses more than disk drives.) disk file and diskette file. Here, the current industry standard terms, hard disk drive (HDD) and floppy disk drive (FDD), are used.

== Early IBM HDDs ==
=== IBM 350 ===
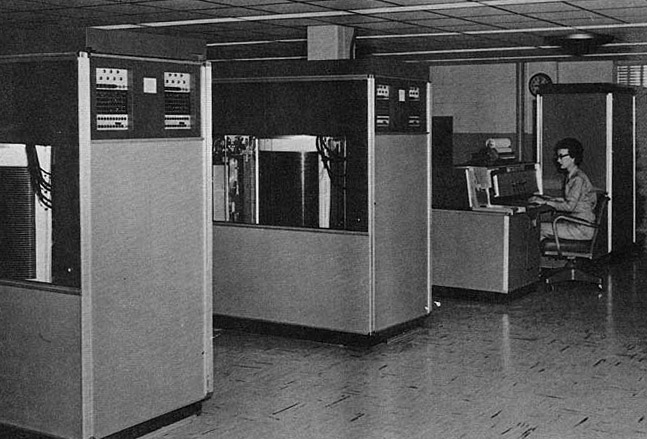
IBM 305 at U.S. Army Red River Arsenal, with two IBM 350 disk drives in the foreground

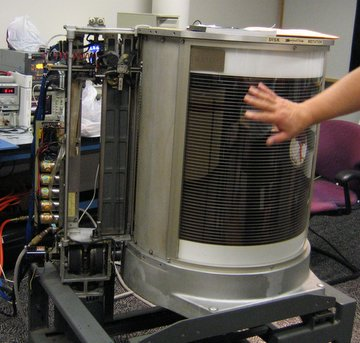
RAMAC mechanism at Computer History Museum

The IBM 350 disk storage unit, the first disk drive, was announced by IBM as a component of the IBM 305 RAMAC computer system on September 14, 1956. Simultaneously a very similar product, the IBM 355, was announced for the IBM 650 RAMAC computer system. RAMAC stood for "Random Access Method of Accounting and Control". The first engineering prototype 350 disk storage shipped to Zellerbach Paper Company, San Francisco, in June 1956, with production shipment beginning in November 1957 with the shipment of a unit to United Airlines in Denver, Colorado.

Its design was motivated by the need for real time accounting in business. The 350 stores 5 million 6-bit characters (3.75 MB). It has fifty 24-inch (610 mm) diameter disks, each with 1,000 sectors of 100 characters each. The disks spin at 1200 rpm. Data transfer rate is 8,800 characters per second. An access mechanism moves a pair of heads up and down to select a disk pair (one down surface and one up surface) and in and out to select a recording track of a surface pair. Several improved models were added in the 1950s. The IBM RAMAC 305 system with 350 disk storage leased for $3,200 per month. The 350 was officially withdrawn in 1969.

U.S. patent 3,503,060 from the RAMAC program is generally considered to be the fundamental patent for disk drives. This first-ever disk drive was initially cancelled by the IBM Board of Directors because of its threat to the IBM punch card business but the IBM San Jose laboratory continued development until the project was approved by IBM's president.

The 350's cabinet is 60 inches (150 cm) long, 68 inches (170 cm) high and 29 inches (74 cm) wide.

The RAMAC unit weighs about one ton, has to be moved around with forklifts, and was frequently transported via large cargo airplanes. According to Currie Munce, research vice president for Hitachi Global Storage Technologies (which acquired IBM's storage business), the storage capacity of the drive could have been increased beyond five million characters, but IBM's marketing department at that time was against a larger capacity drive, because they didn't know how to sell a product with more storage. Nonetheless, double capacity versions of the 350 were announced in January 1959 and shipped later the same year.

In 1984, the RAMAC 350 Disk File was designated an International Historic Landmark by The American Society of Mechanical Engineers. In 2002 at the Magnetic Disk Heritage Center, a team led by Al Hoagland began restoration of an IBM 350 RAMAC in collaboration with Santa Clara University. In 2005, the RAMAC restoration project relocated to the Computer History Museum, Mountain View, California and is now demonstrated to the public in the museum's Revolution exhibition.

=== IBM 353 ===
The IBM 353, used on the IBM 7030, was similar to the IBM 1301, but with a faster transfer rate. It has a capacity of 2,097,152 (2^{21}) 64-bit words or 134,217,728 (2^{27}) bits and transferred 125,000 words per second. A prototype unit shipped in late 1960 was the first disk drive to use one head per surface flying on a layer of compressed air as in the older head design of the IBM 350 disk storage (RAMAC). Production 353s used self-flying heads essentially the same as those of the 1301.

=== IBM 355 ===
The IBM 355 was announced on September 14, 1956, as an addition to the popular IBM 650. It used the mechanism of the IBM 350 with up to three access arms (Note: versus one on the IBM 350) and stored 6 million decimal digits and 600,000 signs. It transferred a full track to and from the magnetic core memory of the 653, an IBM 650 option that included just sixty signed 10-digit words, enough for a single track of disk or a tape record, along with two unrelated features.

=== IBM 1405 ===
The IBM 1405 Disk Storage Unit was announced in 1961 and was designed for use with the IBM 1400 series, medium scale business computers. The 1405 Model 1 has a storage capacity of 10 million alphanumeric characters (60,000,000 bits) on 25 disks. Model 2 has a storage capacity of 20 million alphanumeric characters (120,000,000 bits) on 50 disks. In both models the disks are stacked vertically on a shaft rotating at 1200 rpm.

Each side of each disk has 200 tracks divided into five sectors. Sectors 0–4 are on the top surface and 5–9 are on the bottom surface. Each sector holds either 178 or 200 characters. One to three forked-shaped access arms each contains two read/write heads, one for the top of the disk and the other for the bottom of the same disk. The access arms are mounted on a carriage alongside the disk array. During a seek operation an access arm moved, under electronic control, vertically to seek a disk 0–49 and then horizontally to seek a track 0–199. Ten sectors are available at each track. It takes about 10 ms to read or write a sector.

The access time ranges from 100ms to a maximum access time for model 2 of 800ms and 700ms for model 1. The 1405 model 2 disk storage unit has 100,000 sectors containing either 200 characters in move mode or 178 characters in load mode, which adds a word mark bit to each character. The Model 1 contains 50,000 sectors.

=== IBM 7300 ===
The IBM 7300 Disk Storage Unit was designed for use with the IBM 7070; IBM announced a model 2 in 1959, but when IBM announced the 1301 on June 5, 1961, 7070 and 7074 customers found it to be more attractive than the 7300. The 7300 uses the same technology as the IBM 350, IBM 355 and IBM 1405

=== IBM 1301 ===
The IBM 1301 Disk Storage Unit was announced on June 2, 1961 with two models. It was designed for use with the IBM 7000 series mainframe computers and the IBM 1410. The 1301 stores 28 million characters (168,000,000 bits) per module (25 million characters with the 1410). Each module has 25 large disks and 40 (Note: In addition to the 40 surfaces used for user data, there is one for format tracks, 6 for alternate surfaces and one for maintenance. The top and bottom surfaces are unused.) user recording surfaces, with 250 tracks per surface. The 1301 Model 1 has one module, the Model 2 has two modules, stacked vertically. The disks spin at 1800 rpm. Data is transferred at 90,000 characters per second.

A major advance over the IBM 350 and IBM 1405 is the use of a separate arm and head for each recording surface, with all the arms moving in and out together like a big comb. This eliminates the time needed for the arm to pull the head out of one disk and move up or down to a new disk. Seeking the desired track is also faster since, with the new design, the head will usually be somewhere in the middle of the disk, not starting on the outer edge. Maximum access time is reduced to 180 milliseconds.

The 1301 is the first disk drive to use heads that are aerodynamically designed to fly over the surface of the disk on a thin layer of air. This allows them to be much closer to the recording surface, which greatly improves performance.

The 1301 connects to the computer via the IBM 7631 File Control. Different models of the 7631 allow the 1301 to be used with a 1410 or 7000 series computer, or shared between two such computers.

The IBM 1301 Model 1 leased for $2,100 per month or could be purchased for $115,500. Prices for the Model 2 were $3,500 per month or $185,000 to purchase. The IBM 7631 controller cost an additional $1,185 per month or $56,000 to purchase. All models were withdrawn in 1970.

=== IBM 1302 ===
The IBM 1302 Disk Storage Unit was introduced in September 1963. Improved recording quadrupled its capacity over that of the 1301, to 117 million 6-bit characters per module. Average access time is 165 ms and data can be transferred at 180 K characters/second, more than double the speed of the 1301. There are two access mechanisms per module, one for the inner 250 cylinders and the other for the outer 250 cylinders. As with the 1301, there is a Model 2 which doubles the capacity by stacking two modules. The IBM 1302 Model 1 leased for $5,600 per month or could be purchased for $252,000. Prices for the Model 2 were $7,900 per month or $355,500 to purchase. The IBM 7631 controller cost an additional $1,185 per month or $56,000 to purchase. The 1302 was withdrawn in February 1965.

=== IBM 1311 ===
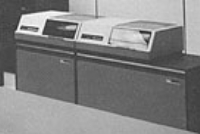
IBM 1311 Disk Drives – Model 2 (slave) & Model 3 (master)

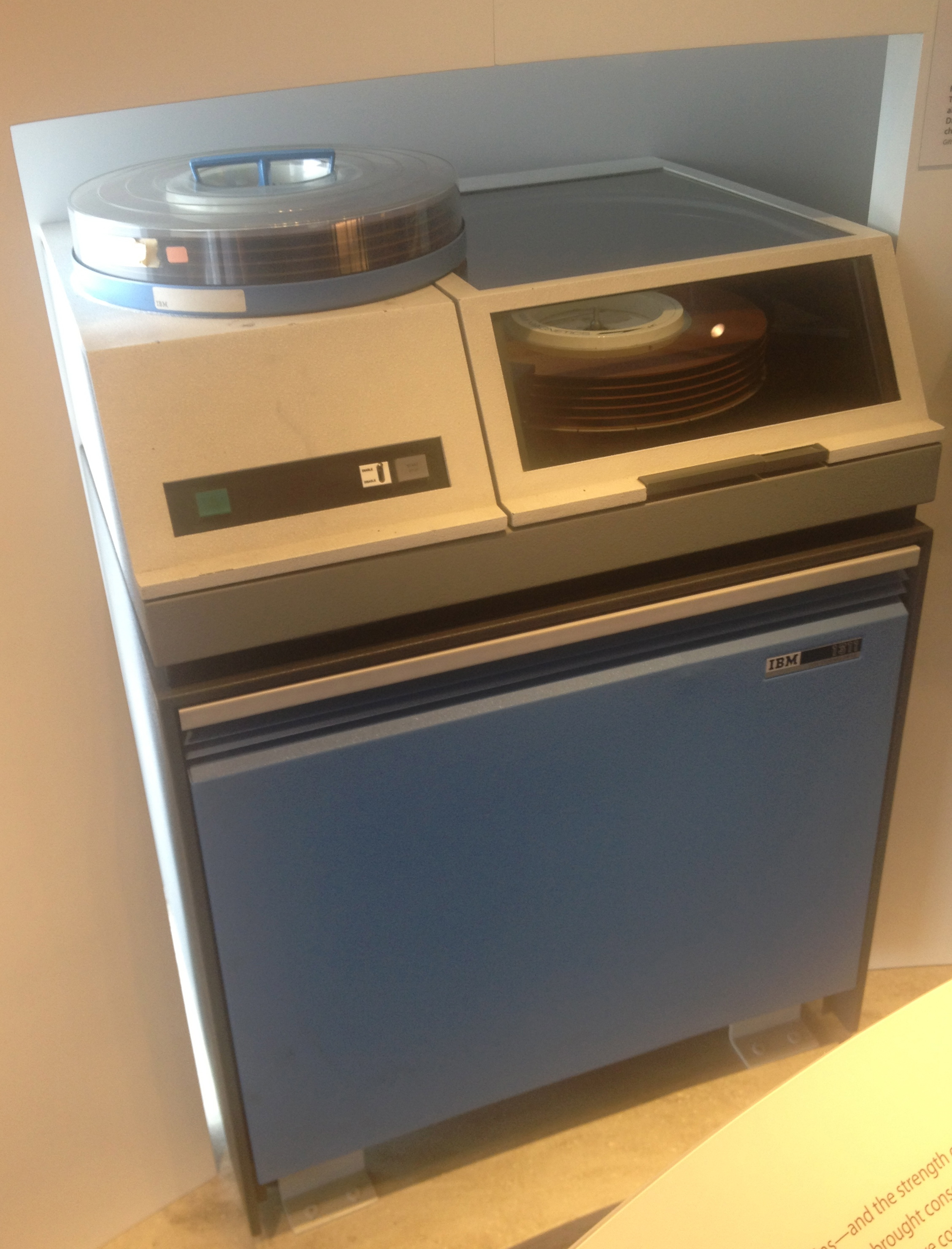
IBM 1311 disk drive with IBM 1316 removable disk pack at the Computer History Museum

The IBM 1311 Disk Storage Drive was announced on October 11, 1962, and was designed for use with several medium-scale business and scientific computers. The 1311 is about the size and shape of a top-loading washing machine and stores 2 million characters (12,000,000 bits) (or, in so-called "Load Mode" on an IBM 1401, a sector can hold 90 7-bit characters, or 12,600,000 bits total) on a removable IBM 1316 disk pack. Seven models of the 1311 were introduced during the 1960s. They were withdrawn during the early 1970s.

Each IBM 1316 Disk Pack is 4 inches (100 mm) high, weighs 10 pounds (4.5 kg) and contains six 14-inch (360 mm) diameter disks, yielding 10 recording surfaces (the outer surfaces are not used). The 10 individual read/write heads are mounted on a common actuator within the disk drive which moves in and out hydraulically and is mechanically detented at the desired track before reading or writing occurs. The disks spin at 1500 rpm. Each recording surface has 100 tracks with 20 sectors per track. Each sector stores 100 characters. The disk pack is covered with a clear plastic shell and a bottom cover when not in use. A lifting handle in the top center of the cover is rotated to release the bottom cover. Then the top of the 1311 drive is opened and the plastic shell lowered into the disk-drive opening (assuming it is empty). The handle is turned again to lock the disks in place and release the plastic shell, which is then removed and the drive cover closed. The process is reversed to remove a disk pack. The same methods are used for many later disk packs.

There are seven models of the 1311 disk drive. The first drive attached to a system is a "master drive" which contains the controller and can control a number of Model 2 "slave drives."

1. Master drive on an IBM 1440, IBM 1460, or IBM 1240 system and can control up to four Model 2 drives. Introduced October 11, 1962. Withdrawn February 8, 1971.
2. Slave drive to a master drive. Can have any special feature incorporated that the master drive has incorporated. Introduced October 11, 1962. Withdrawn January 6, 1975.
3. Master drive on IBM 1620 or IBM 1710 system and can control up to three Model 2 drives. Does not support any special features. Introduced October 11, 1962. Withdrawn May 12, 1971.
4. Master drive on an IBM 1401 system and can control up to four Model 2 drives. Introduced October 11, 1962. Withdrawn February 8, 1971.
5. Master drive on an IBM 1410, IBM 7010, or IBM 7740 system and can control up to four Model 2 drives. Direct Seek comes as standard on this model. Introduced January 7, 1963. Withdrawn May 12, 1971.
6. No information available, probably a master drive. Introduced March 5, 1968. Withdrawn February 2, 1971.
7. No information available, probably a slave drive to Model 6. Introduced March 5, 1968. Withdrawn February 2, 1971.

The optional special features are:

- Direct Seek: Without this option every seek returns to track zero first.
- Scan Disk: Automatic rapid search for identifier or condition.
- Seek Overlap: Allows a seek to overlap a single read or write, and any number of other seeks, when multiple drives are in use.
- Track Record: Increases the capacity of the disk by writing a single large record per track instead of using 20 separate sectors. A track can hold 2,980 characters in 6-bit 'Move Mode", and 2,682 7-bit characters in "Load Mode", giving the drive a total capacity of 17,880,000 bits in 6-bit mode, and 18,774,000 bits in 7-bit mode.

The master drives, Models 1, 3, 4, and 5, which contain extra power supplies and the control logic, are about a foot wider than the Model 2 slave drive.

== IBM System/360 and other IBM mainframe HDDs ==
=== IBM 2302 ===
The IBM 2302 is the System/360 version of the 1302, with track formatting in accordance with S/360 DASD architecture rather than 7000 series architecture.

It uses a non-removable module of 25 platters, of which 46 surfaces are used for recording. The 2302 Model 3 contains one module and the Model 4 two. There are two independent access mechanisms per module, one for the innermost 250 cylinders, and one for the outermost 250, tracks available to each access mechanism are called an access group. The access mechanism provides one read/write head per track. Average rotational delay is 17 milliseconds (msec), and maximum is 34 msec. Maximum seek time per access group is 180 msec. The track size is 4985 bytes; with formatting information and alternate tracks, module capacity is stated as 112 MB. The 2302 attaches to IBM mainframes via a IBM 2841 Storage Control Unit.

=== IBM 2305 ===
The IBM 2305 fixed head storage (a fixed-head disk drive sometimes incorrectly called a drum) and associated IBM 2835 Storage Control were announced in 1970, initially to connect to the 360/85 and 360/195 using the IBM 2880 Block Multiplexor Channel.

The 2305 Drive was in much demand when the System 370 offered Virtual Storage, and these 2305s were often used for paging devices. They were used in this way on 3155, 3165, 3158, 3168, 3033, 4341, and 3081 (with special feature microcode.) The 2305 was also used for high activity small data sets such as catalogs and job queues.

The 2305-1 has a capacity of 5.4 MB and runs at 3.0 MB/second when attached using the 2-byte channel interface. Average access time is 2.5 ms. The larger 2305-2 has a capacity of 11.2 MB and runs at 1.5 MB/second with an average access time of 5 ms.

The 2305 provides large-scale IBM computers with fast, continuous access to small-sized quantities of information. Its capacity and high data rate make it ideal for some systems residence functions, work files, job queues, indices and data sets that are used repeatedly. Its fast response time makes it attractive as a paging device in a heavily loaded systems, where there are 1.5 or more transactions per second.

=== IBM 2311 ===
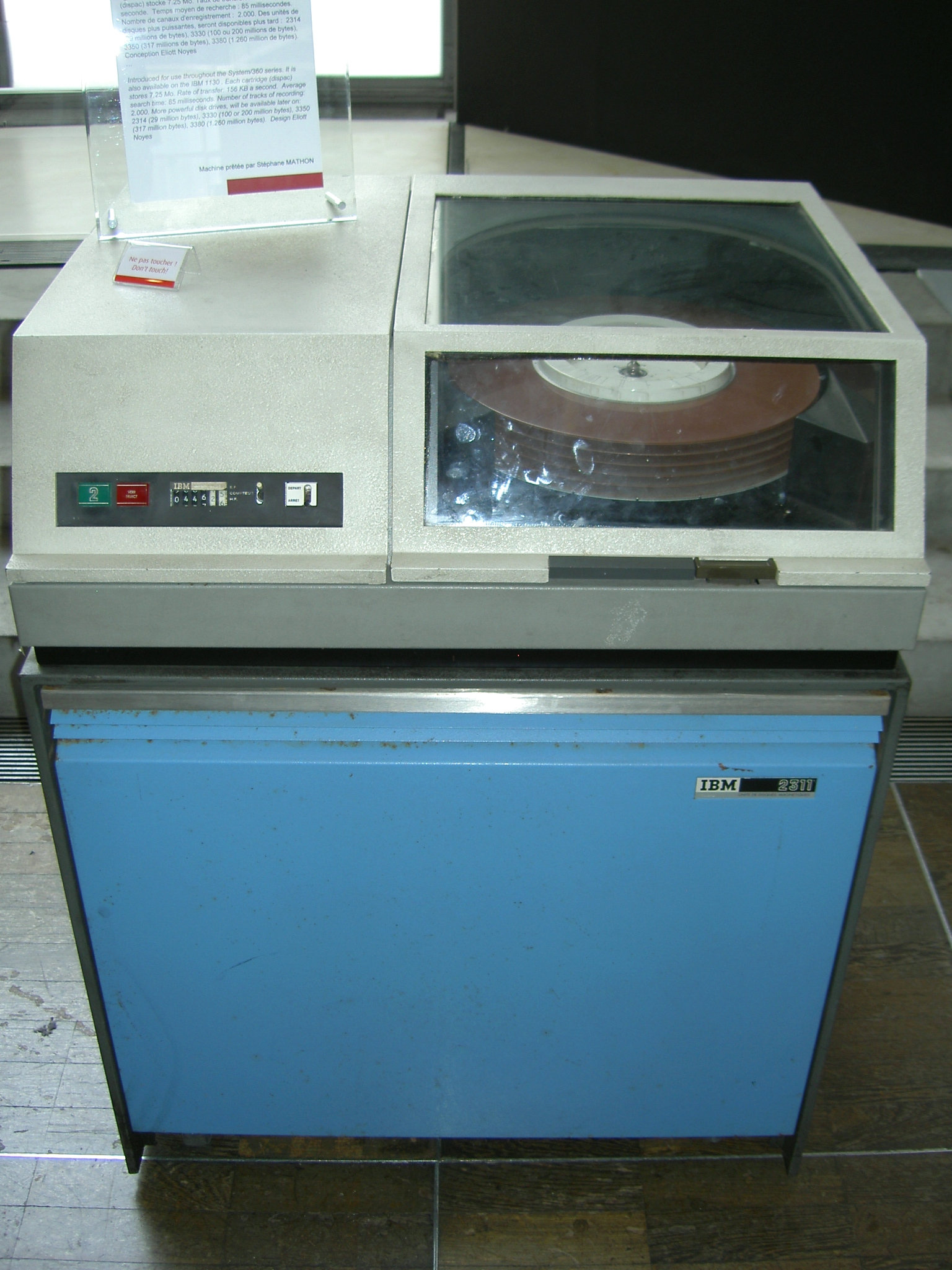
IBM 2311 Disk Storage Drive, with its six platters

The IBM 2311 Disk Storage Drive was introduced with the 2841 Control Unit in 1964 for use throughout the IBM System/360; the combination was also available on the IBM 1130 and the IBM 1800. The drive also directly attaches to the IBM System/360 Model 20 and the IBM System/360 Model 25. All drives used the IBM 1316 Disk Pack introduced with the IBM 1311.

The 2311 Model 1 attaches to most IBM mainframes through a 2841 Control Unit; it attaches to the System/360 Model 25 thru a Disk Attachment Control which provides the function of the control unit. Disk packs are written in these attachments in IBM's count key data variable record length format.

The 2311 models 11 or 12 are used when attached to an integrated control of the System/360 Model 20 and the disk packs are written with a fixed sector format. The disk packs are not interchangeable between those written on the Model 1 and those written on the Models 11 or 12.

The 2311 mechanism is largely identical to the 1311, but recording improvements allow higher data density. The 2311 stores 7.25 megabytes on a single removable IBM 1316 disk pack (the same type used on the IBM 1311) consisting of six platters that rotate as a single unit. The 2311 has ten individual read/write (R/W) heads mounted on a common actuator which moves in and out hydraulically and is mechanically detented at the desired track before reading or writing occurred. Each recording surface has 200 tracks plus three optional tracks which can be used as alternatives in case faulty tracks are discovered. Average seek time is 85 ms. Data transfer rate is 156 kB/s.

Because the 2311 was to be used with a wide variety of computers within the 360 product line, its electrical interconnection was standardized. This created an opportunity for other manufacturers to sell plug compatible disk drives for use with IBM computers and an entire industry was born.

=== IBM 2314/2319 ===
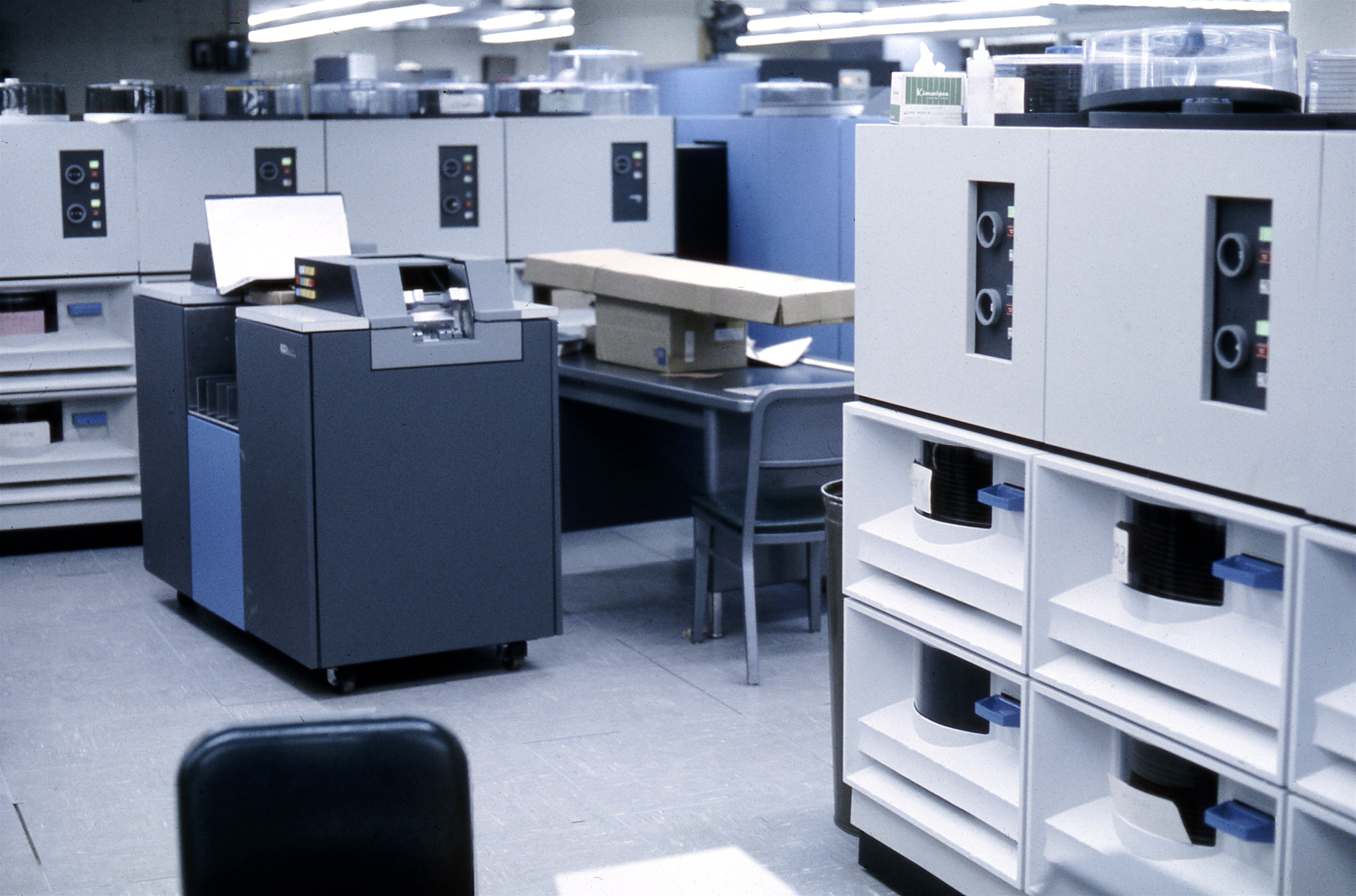
IBM 2314s at the University of Michigan. Note removable disk packs and empty covers on top of the drives.

==== IBM 2314 Disk Access Storage Facility Model 1 ====
The IBM 2314 Disk Access Storage Facility Model 1 was introduced on April 22, 1965, one year after the System/360 introduction. It was used with the System/360 and the System/370 lines. With the Two Channel Switch feature it could interface with two 360/370 channels. The 2314 Disk access mechanism was similar to the 2311, but further recording improvements allowed higher data density. The 2314 stored 29,176,000 characters (200×20×7294 bytes per track) on a single removable IBM 2316 disk pack which was similar in design to the 1316 but was taller as a result of increasing the number of disks from six to eleven. The 2316 disk pack containing the eleven 14-inch (360 mm) diameter disks yielded 20 recording surfaces. The drive access consisted of 20 individual R/W heads mounted on a common actuator which was moved in and out hydraulically and mechanically detented at the desired track before reading or writing occurred. Each recording surface has 200 tracks. Access time was initially the same as the 2311, but later models were faster as a result of improvements made in the hydraulic actuator. Data transfer rate was doubled to 310 kB/s.

The original Model 1 consists nine disk drives bundled together with one price; separately shipped was a storage control unit, a single drive module, and two four drive modules for a total of nine drives. The drives are mounted in individual drawers that are unlatched and pulled out to access the disk pack. Because of their appearance they acquired the nickname of "Pizza Ovens". Only eight drives of the nine are available to the computer at any one time. The ninth drive is there for a spare for the user and can also be worked on "offline" by a Field Engineer while the other drives are in use by the customer. Each drive's system address is determined in part by a user-swappable plug, one such plug denoting a spare drive not system accessible. This permits physically changing the address of a drive by changing the plug.

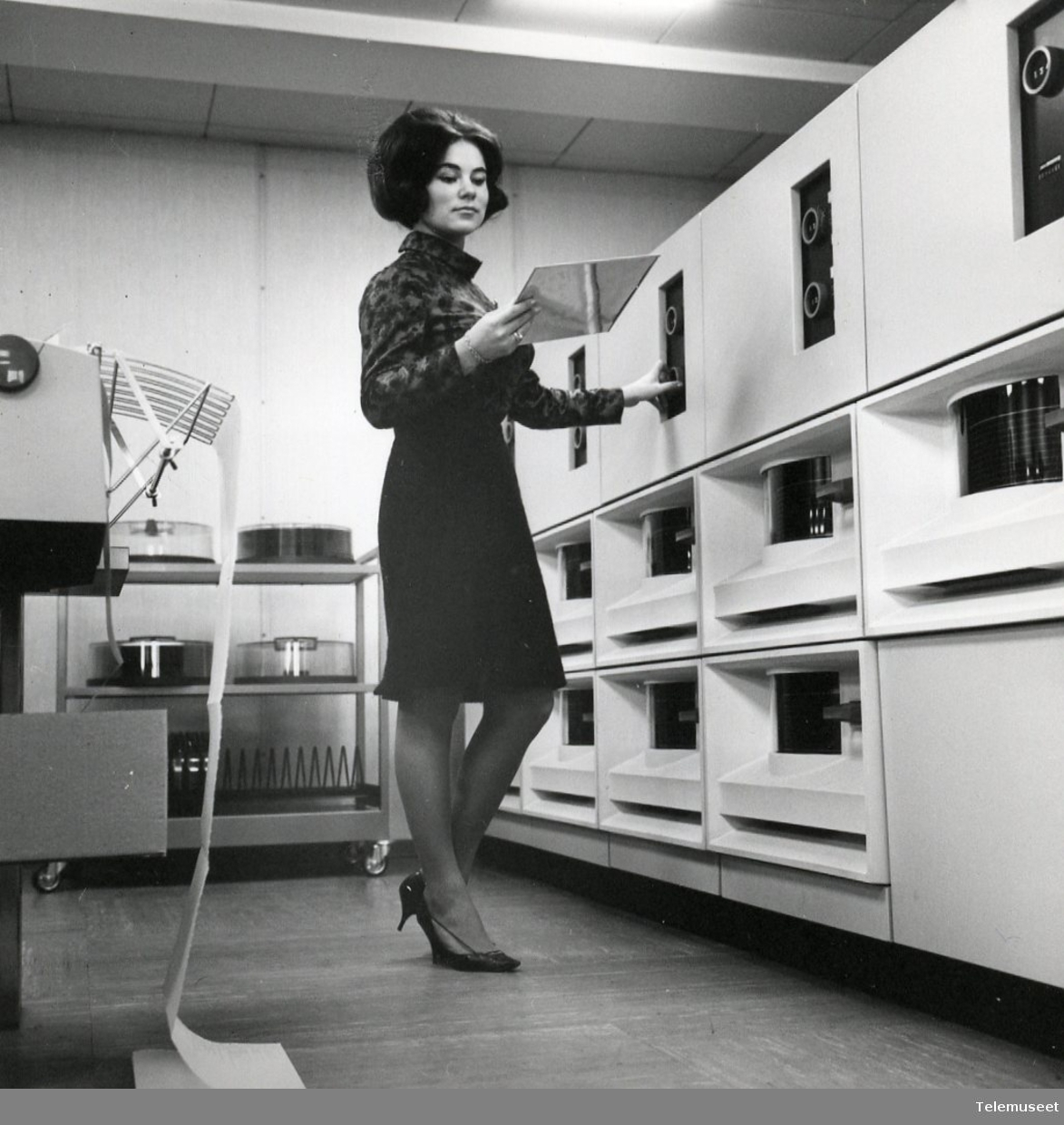
IBM 2314

A 2844 Control Unit can be added to the 2314 Control Unit which allows two S/360 Channels simultaneous access to two separate disk drives in the Storage Facility.

Other 2314 models came later:

==== IBM 2314 direct access storage facility - A series ====
In 1969 IBM unbundled the facility into separate models allowing up to nine drives (eight on line) attached to a 2314 Storage Control:

- 2312 Disk Storage, a one drive module.
- 2313 Disk Storage, a four drive module.
- 2318 Disk Storage, a two drive module.

==== IBM 2319 ====
- In a response to competition from plug compatible manufacturers of 2314 equivalent storage subsystems, IBM beginning 1970 introduced a series of low priced three drive module 2319s which were manufactured by removing one module from the four drive module 2313, rebranding it as a 2319 A1 and offering it at a substantially reduced rental price. This had the effect of lowering the rental price to new customers while keeping the high rental price on existing customers. The 2319-A1 attaches to integrated controllers for only the System/370 Models 135 and 145. Conventional 2314 DASD such as the 2312 or 2318 can attach to the 2319-A1
- 2319 B series of three disk drives modules allow three, six or nine drive attachment to a new 2314 Model B Storage Control Unit.

=== IBM 3310 ===
IBM introduced the IBM 3310 Direct Access Storage Device on January 30, 1979, for IBM 4331 midrange computers. Each drive had a capacity of 64.5 MB. The 3310 was a fixed-block architecture device, used on DOS/VSE and VM, the only S/370 operating systems that supported FBA devices.

=== IBM 3330 ===
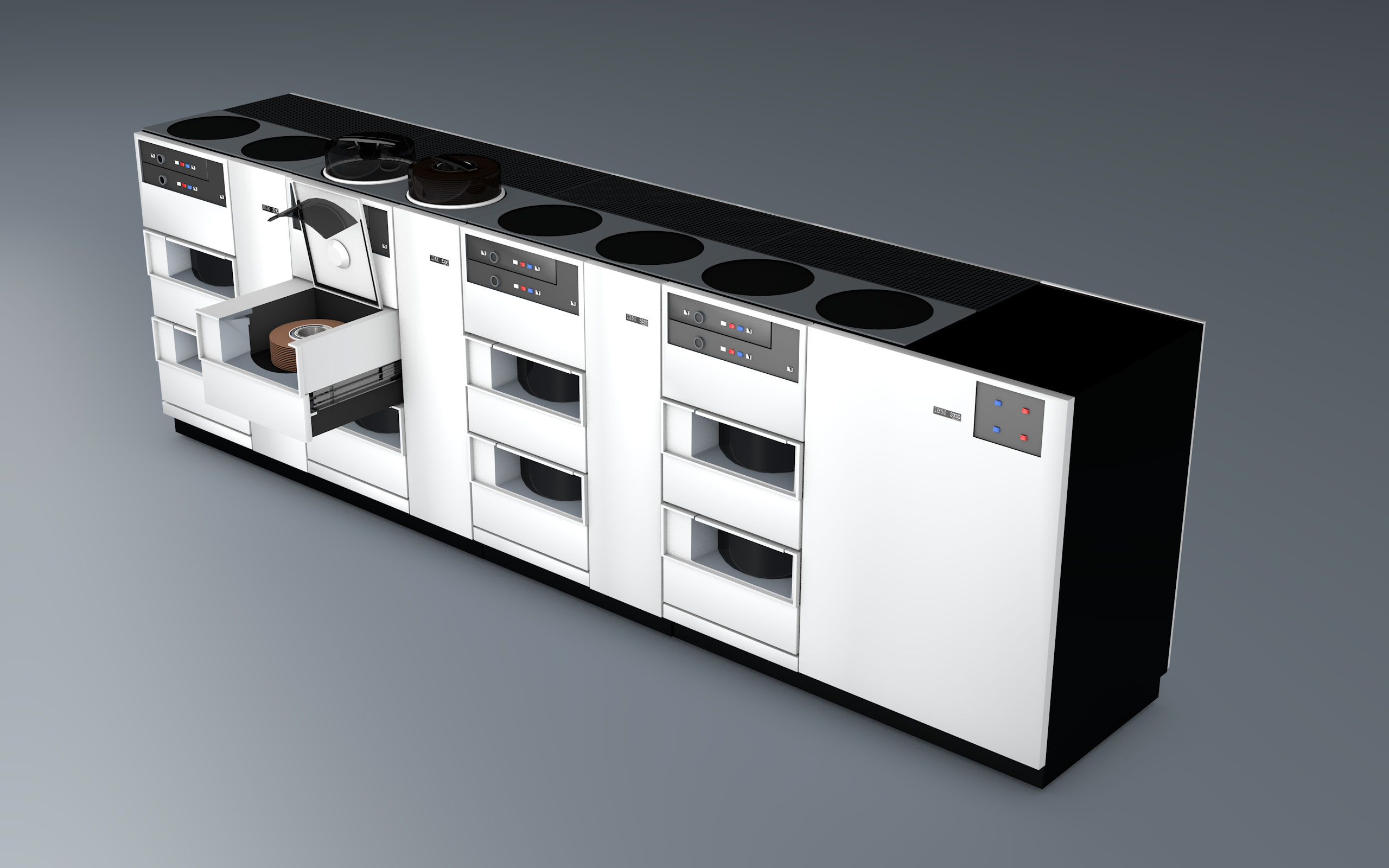
3D artist's concept of an IBM 3330 Direct Access Storage Facility. Shown are three 3330s and one 3333 (on the right).

The IBM 3330 Direct Access Storage Facility, code-named Merlin, was introduced in June 1970 for use with the IBM System/370 and the IBM System 360/195. The original announcement included the 3330 Model 1, with two drives, and the 3330 Model 2, with only one drive. The 3330 has removable disk packs, similar to its predecessors, and the packs hold 100 MB (404×19×13,030 bytes). Access time is 30 ms and data transfers at 806 kB/s. A major advance introduced with the 3330 is the use of error correction, which makes the drives more reliable and reduces costs because small imperfections in the disk surface can be tolerated. The circuitry can correct error bursts up to 11 bits long through use of fire codes.

The initial configuration consists of one storage control unit (3830 Model 1) bolted to a 3330, with optionally three more 3330's bolted together. This is known as a string, making a maximum of eight drives in a string.

In August 1972 IBM announced the 3830 Model 2 Storage Control and the 3333 Disk Storage and Control, separating the control unit from the string. The 3830 became a director type of storage control, controlling one or more strings. The now first unit of the string, the 3333 contains a controller and two drives and it can control up to three attached 3330's for a maximum of eight drives in the string as shown in the illustration. The 3830 Model 2 can connect two 3333's for a maximum of 16 drives per storage control and the 3333 optionally has a string switch that enables it to be connected to two different storage controls.

In 1973 IBM announced double density versions (-11 models) of the 3330 product line: the 3333–11, 3330-11 and the 3336–11; the 3336-11 Disk Packs hold up to 200 MB (808x19x13,030 bytes). It is not possible to mix single and double density drives within a string. It is possible to field upgrade existing 3330 Models to Model 11, but this is a major task, as the drives had to be converted, and all the existing data had to be copied to the new media.

The 3330 was withdrawn in 1983.

=== IBM 3340 and 3344 ===
The IBM 3340 and 3344 have similar characteristics. However, only a 3340 can serve as head of string; there are no A model 3344 drives, and a 3344 must be attached to a 3340 A model as head of string.

==== IBM 3340 ====
The IBM 3340 Direct Access Storage Facility, code-named Winchester, was introduced in March 1973 for use with IBM System/370. Three models were announced, the 3340-A2 with two drives and a controller, the models B2 (two drives) and B1 (one drive). B-units can connect to the model A2 to a maximum of eight drives.

It uses removable data modules that included the head and arm assembly; an access door of the data module opens or closes during a mechanical load/unload process to connect the data module to the drive; unlike previous disk packs and cartridges there is no cover to remove during the insertion process. Access time is 25 millisecond and data transfers at 885 kB/s. Three versions of the removable IBM 3348 Data Module were sold, one with 35 megabyte capacity, another with 70 megabytes, the third also has 70 megabytes, of which 500 kilobytes were accessible with fixed heads for faster access. The 3340 also uses error correction. It was withdrawn in 1984.

The 3340 was developed in San Jose under the leadership of Ken Haughton. Early on, the design was focused on two removable 30 megabyte modules. Because of this 30/30 configuration, the code name Winchester was selected after the famous Winchester .30-30 rifle; subsequently the capacities were increased, but the code name stuck.

One significant aspect of this product, and the reason that disk drives in general became known as "Winchester technology", was that this head design was very low cost and did not require the heads to be unloaded from the media. Winchester technology allowed the head to land and take off from the disk media as the disk spun up and down. This resulted in very significant savings and a large reduction of complexity of the head and arm actuating mechanism. This head design rapidly became a standard design within the disk drive manufacturing community.

Up into the early 1990s the term Winchester or Winnie was used for hard disk drives in general long after the introduction of the 3340. A word derived from this name was used in the general sense of "hard drive" in several other languages for an even longer time, for example in Russian (винчестер, sometimes shortened to винт or винч), but is gradually disappearing in most parts of the world.

==== IBM 3344 ====
The IBM 3344 is similar to the 3340, except that it uses fixed media rather than removable 3348 data modules, each spindle has four logical drives each with the capacity of a 3348–70, there is no A (head of string) model and it is only available in dual drive models. The 3344-B2F is identical to the 3344-B2 except that both drives have fixed heads over some cylinders. Both 3344-B2 and 3344-B2F require a 3340-A2 or 3340-A2F as head of string. Inside, the 3344 is exactly the same as IBM 3350, the difference is only in the microcode in the control unit.

=== IBM 3350 ===
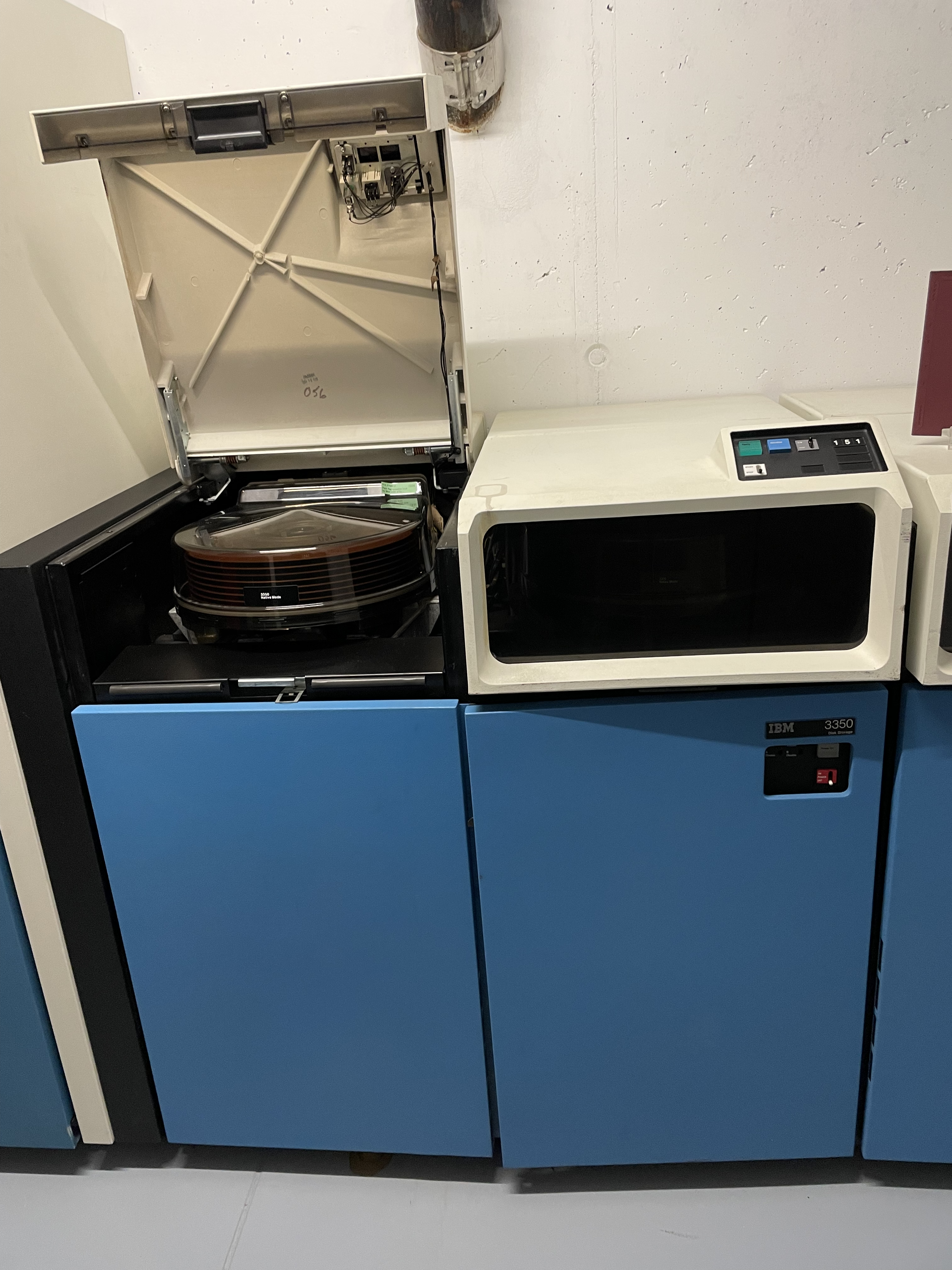
IBM 3350 at the Enter Museum

The IBM 3350 Direct Access Storage Facility, code-named Madrid, was introduced in 1975 for use with IBM System/370. Its non-removable head-disk assemblies (HDAs) are sealed and included the head and arm assembly. The 3350 disk geometry is 555 cylinders, 30 heads, and 19,069 bytes per track, which give each HDA a storage capacity of 317,498,850 bytes. Sealed HDAs were standard practice on all IBM DASD hereafter.

Disk units are identified as Models A2, A2F, B2, B2F, C2, and C2F with each model containing two HDAs. Model A2 and A2F has one additional electronic board, allowing it to be connected to the control unit. They are referred to as controllers, and also sometimes head-of-string. The models are installed in strings of units with an A2 or A2F unit, and then up to three B2 units or up to two B2s and a C2. The A2 unit usually has a string switch, allowing it to be connected to two different storage control units. This allows two I/O operations simultaneously take place to two different HDAs in the string. The storage control unit can be a 3830 Model 2, or the ISC (Integrated Storage Control) found in the 3148, 3158 or 3168 cpu's. Also later control units (3880) are backwards compatible and can be used. The C2s unit also contains a controller, that can be connected to a storage control unit and serves as a secondary path to itself and the A2 and B2 units. The C2 controller is a spare, it can only be used when the controller in the A unit is broken, and subsequently powered off. It has also limited connections, usually the A unit has a string switch, but the C unit only can be connected to one storage control unit. The valid 3350 strings are: -A, -AB, -ABB, -ABBB, -AC-, -ABC-, or -ABBC- configurations.

The "x2F", as in Model A2F, unit is a normal x2 unit, but its two HDAs also have a Fixed Head area over the first five cylinders, thereby reducing (Note: Note, however, that the I/O to the fixed-head area can be delayed by a seek in progress to one of the remaining cylinders; there is no equivalent to the multiple exposures of the 2305 fixed-head disk.) seek time to zero for these five cylinders. This fixed head area is intended to be allocated to the frequently accessed HASP or JES2 checkpoint area and thus greatly reduce head motion on the SPOOL device. The fixed head area can also be utilized for TSO swap data (MVT and SVS) and system swap data (MVS) wherein the swap data for SVS and MVS consist of blocks of pages that have been in memory when an address space is selected for swap-out; those pages need not be contiguous and in general do not include pages that have not been modified since their last page-in. This system architecture greatly improves context switches between TSO users or batch regions.

The IBM 3350 family was withdrawn in September 1994.

=== IBM 3370 and 3375 ===
==== IBM 3370 ====
IBM introduced the IBM 3370 Direct Access Storage Device in January 1979 for IBM 4331, 4341, and System/38 midrange computers. It has seven fixed 14-inch (360 mm) disks, and each unit has a capacity of 571 MB. It was the first HDD to use thin-film head technology; research on that technology started at Thomas J. Watson Research Center in the late 1960s. The 3370 was a fixed-block architecture device, used on DOS/VSE and VM, the only S/370 operating systems that supported FBA devices.

==== IBM 3375 ====
The sister unit was called the IBM 3375 and used count key data architecture, which was required for OS/360 and successor operating systems.

=== IBM 3380 ===
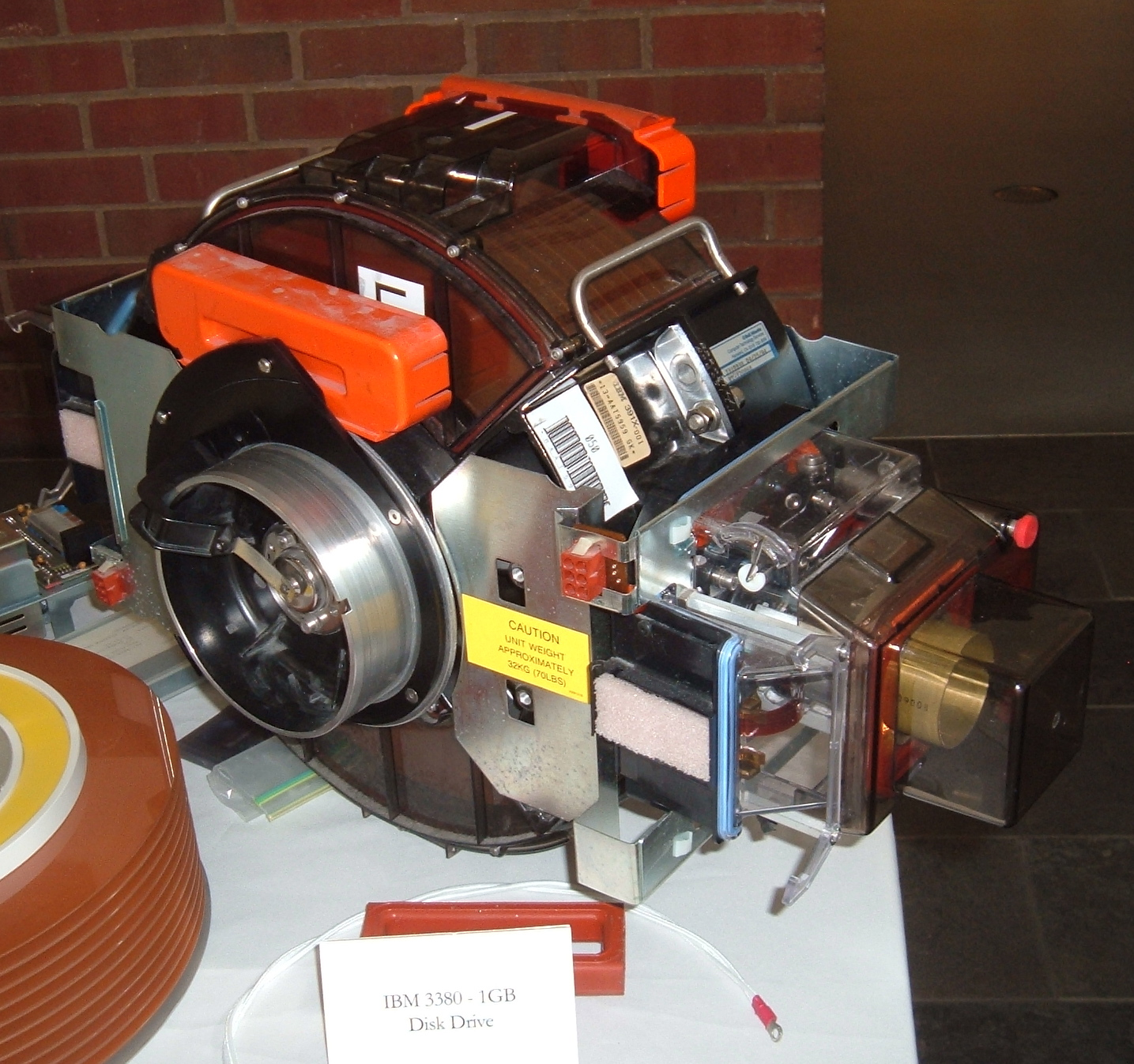
IBM 3380 disk drive module

The IBM 3380 Direct Access Storage Device was introduced on June 11, 1980. It uses film head technology and has a unit capacity of 2.52 gigabytes (two hard disk assemblies each with two independent actuators each accessing 630 MB within one 3380 unit) with a data transfer rate of 3 megabytes per second. Average access time was 16 ms. Purchase price at time of introduction ranged from $81,000 to $142,200. Due to tribology problems encountered between heads and media, the first units did not ship until October 1981.

Similar to its predecessor (3350) the standard configuration is one A unit and up to three B units, but because each 3380 contains four devices each string now can contain up to 16 devices. Usually it is connected to a 3880 storage control units with two paths, allowing two simultaneous I/O operations, however, the operations must target different HDAs.

In February 1985, IBM announced a double density version – the Extended Capability Models of the 3380 (3380 E) having 5.04 gigabytes per 3380 unit, that is, two 1.26 gigabyte actuators on two hard disk assemblies.

A triple capacity version, the 3380 K was announced in August 1987 having 7.562 gigabytes per 3380 unit, that is, two 1.89 gigabyte actuators on two hard disk assemblies. The new Model K and Model J can optionally run in four-path mode. In this mode, the string has two A units located in the middle, and up to three B units connected on each side, giving a maximum of 32 devices in a string. This requires they are connected to a 3990 storage control unit, and allows four simultaneous I/O operation in the string.

There are twelve models of the IBM 3380 family: six A-units, five B-units and one C-unit. A-units (heads of string) contain additional logic to perform string controller functions and connect to IBM storage control units (3880 or 3990). The C-units connect directly to an IBM channel. B-units connects to A-units or C-units.

The last models were withdrawn by IBM in May 1996 representing a production run of 15 years; a run longer than most disk drives

=== IBM 3390 ===
The IBM 3390 Direct Access Storage Device series was introduced November 1989, offering a maximum storage of up to 22 gigabytes in a string of multiple drives. Cost of a storage system varied by configuration and capacity, between $90,000 and $795,000.

A 3390 string consists of an A unit placed in the middle, and optionally one or two B units bolted to its sides. The A unit can have four or eight devices, each B unit can have up to 12 devices. The 3390 is always running in four-path mode, connected to a 3990 storage control unit. Optionally the 3990 can have a second 3390 string attached, giving a maximum of 64 devices in the subsystem.

Packaged in Hard Disk Assemblies with two actuator-head units and one set of platters, a model 1 HDA provides 1.89 GB before formatting and a model 2 provides 3.78 GB/HDA. The Model 3 enhancement to the drive family, announced September 11, 1991, increased capacity 1.5 times to 5.67 GB/HDA and the Model 9, announced May 20, 1993, further increased capacity 3 times to 11.3 GB/HDA.

All the preceding DASD models are equipped with a large AC motor, driving the HDA with a belt; however, the 3390 HDA is directly driven by a DC motor that is included in the enclosure.

The 3390 Model 9 was the last Single Large Expensive Disk (sometimes called SLEDs) drive announced by IBM.

=== IBM 9340 and 9345 ===
==== IBM 9345 ====
The IBM 9345 HDD first shipped in Nov 1990 as an RPQ on IBMs SCSE (SuperComputing Systems Extensions). Developed at IBM's San Jose, California laboratory under the code name Sawmill. It was an up to 1.5 GB full height 5 1/4-inch HDD using up to 8 130 mm disks. It was the first HDD to use MR (Magneto Resistive) heads.

==== IBM 9340 ====
In October 1991 the 9345 DASD was announced as part of the IBM 9340 channel-attached, count key data (CKD) DASD subsystem family which attached to IBM mainframes including the ES/9000 processor family. The 9345 DASD Model 1 had two 1.0 GB HDDs while the Model 2 had two 1.5 GB HDDs.

For most practical applications, the 9340/9345 was functionally equivalent to a 3990/3390, although without non-volatile RAM cache of the 3990 and with a somewhat shorter maximum block length than the 3390.

The OS's IOS component learned of this device's characteristics through a special initializer, IECCINIT, which also serviced other DASD device types, and for the same purpose. It was at initialization-time that the OS learned that the 9340 has no non-volatile cache and the 9345 has a shorter than expected track capacity. The initializer, therefore, assigned a different device type than the 3990/3390.

=== 9330 family of disk drives ===
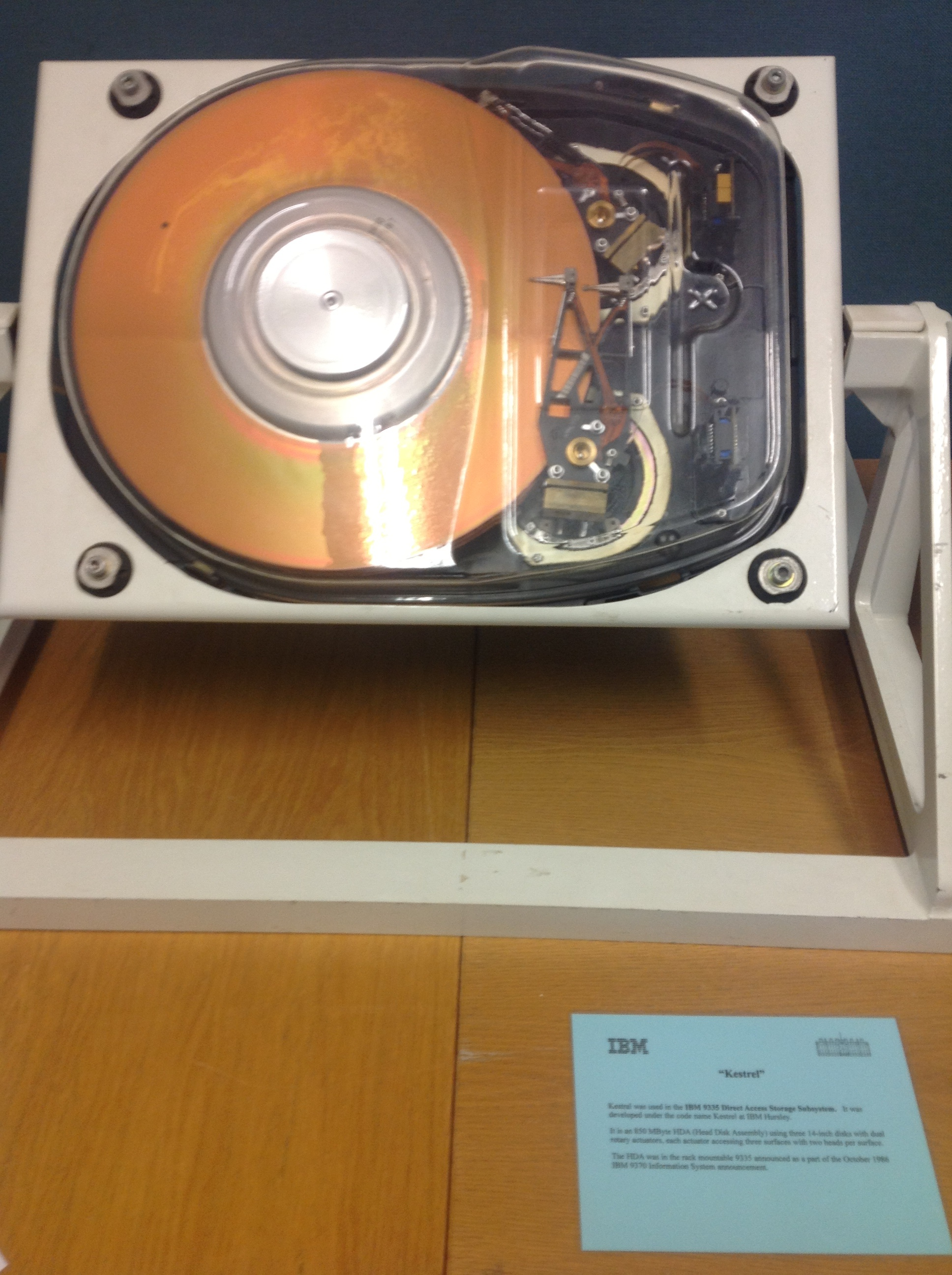
9335 drive

1. 9331 Diskette Unit models 1 and 11 contained one 8-inch FDD while the models 2 and 12 contained one 5 1/4-inch FDD.
2. 9332 Direct Access Storage Device used the IBM 0667 HDD.
3. 9333 High Performance Disk Drive Subsystem used the IBM 0664 or IBM 0681 HDDs depending upon subsystem model
4. 9334 Disk Expansion Unit attaches from one to four SCSI HDDs to the RS/6000 system.
5. 9335 Direct Access Storage Subsystem This HDD used in this subsystem was developed under the code name "Kestrel" at IBM Hursley, UK, and was an 850 MB HDD using three 14-inch disks with dual rotary actuators, each actuator accessing three surfaces with two heads per surface. The HDD was in the rack mountable 9335 announced as a part of the October 1986 IBM 9370 Information System announcement. There is no known OEM version of this HDD.
6. 9336 Disk Unit used the IBM 0681 HDD (Redwing)
7. 9337 Disk Array Subsystem used the IBM 0662 (Spitfire) or 0663 (Corsair) HDDs.

== HDDs offered for IBM small systems ==
=== IBM 2310 ===
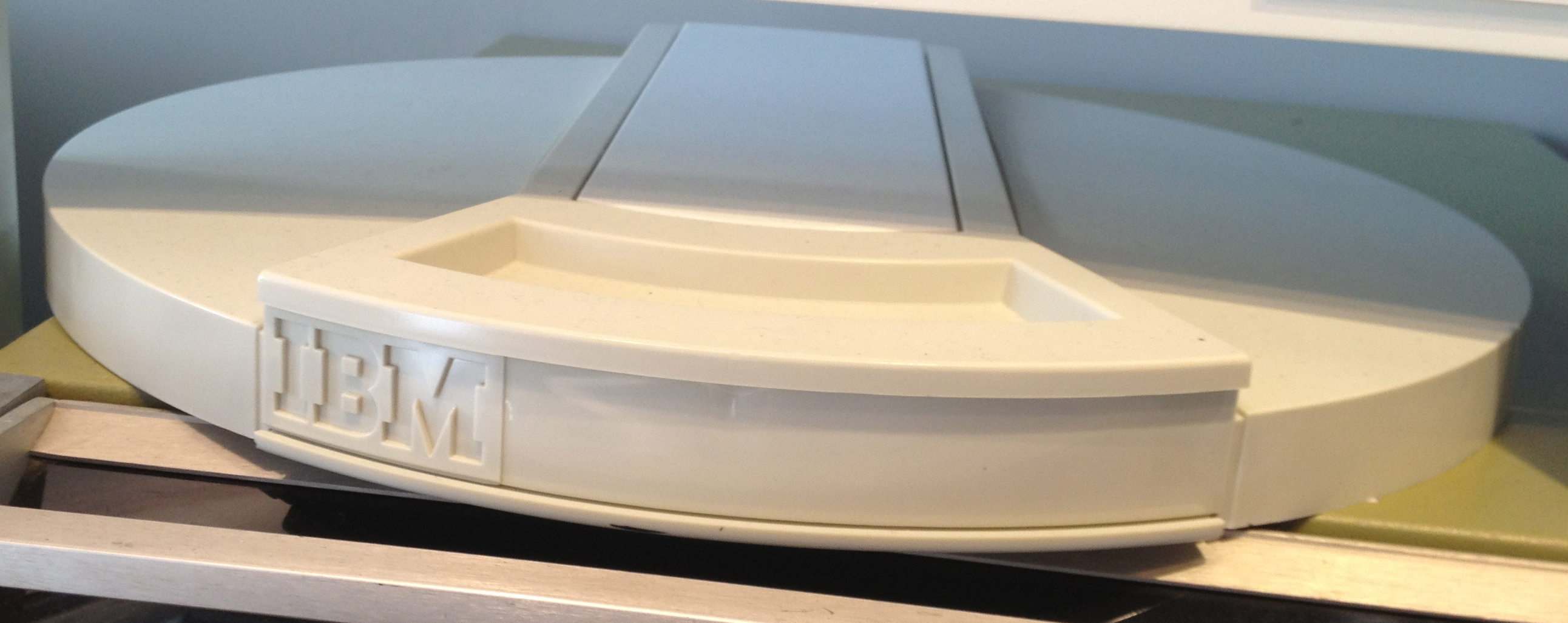
IBM 2315 disk cartridge

The IBM 2310 Removable Cartridge Drive was announced in 1964 with the IBM 1800, and then in 1965 with the IBM 1130; it likely first shipped with the 1130 in late 1965. It could store 512,000 16-bit words (1,024,000 bytes) on an IBM 2315 cartridge. A single 14-inch (360 mm) oxide-coated aluminum disk spun in a plastic shell with openings for the read/write arm and two heads.

=== IBM 5444 ===
The IBM 5444 was announced September 1969 as part of System/3. Developed at IBM's Hursley, England, laboratory under code name Dolphin it used the 5440 disk cartridge. The cartridge in turn contained one 14-inch disk. There were three models:

- Model 1 has one fixed disk and one removable disk each with 100 tracks per surface for a disk cartridge capacity of 1.23 MB
- Model 2 has one fixed disk and one removable disk each with 200 tracks per surface for a disk cartridge capacity of 2.46 MB
- Model 3 has only one removable disk with 200 tracks per surface for a disk cartridge capacity of 2.46 MB

=== IBM 62GV ===
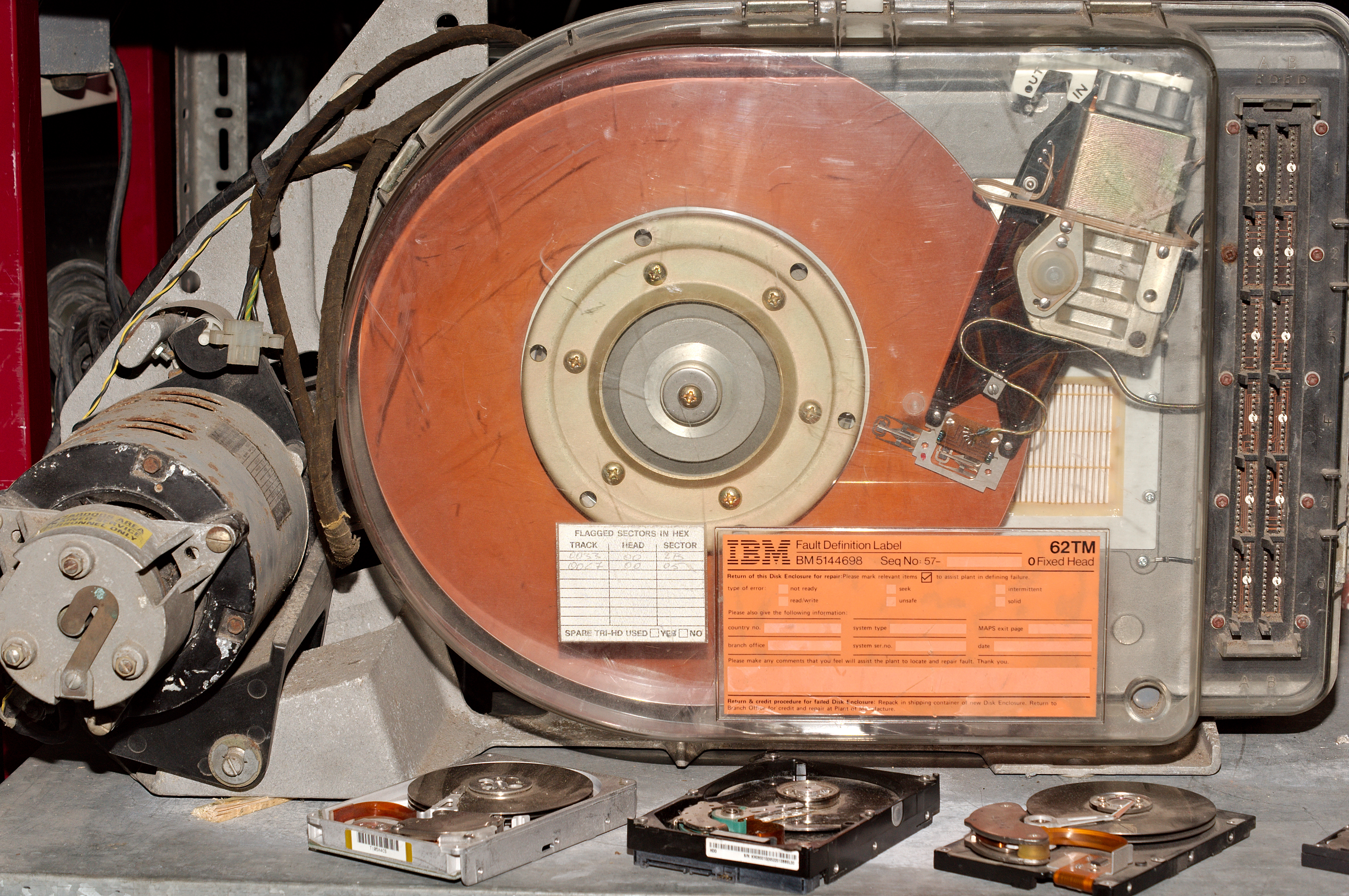
IBM 62TM

The 62GV first shipped in May 1974. Developed at IBM's Hursley, UK, laboratory under the code name Gulliver with an initial capacity of 5 MB. Subsequent models have 10 MB (62TM) and 14 MB capacities. It used a Swinging Arm actuator with one 14-inch disk. The simple design of the actuator, invented at IBM's UK Hursley Labs, became IBM's most licensed electro-mechanical invention of all time, the actuator and filtration system being adopted in the 1980s eventually for all HDDs, and still universal nearly 40 years and 10 Billion arms later. During its production life the IBM 62GV shipped 177,000 units making it the first HDD known to have shipped in excess of 100,000 units.

== OEM and Small Systems HDDs ==
This section lists IBM manufactured HDDs offered both as an OEM product and for attachment to IBMs small systems such as the System/3, System/32, /34 and /36 and the AS/400. HDDs are identified by their OEM model number and listed chronologically by date of first customer shipment.

=== IBM 0680 ===
The 0680 first shipped in 1979 on most IBM small systems and the low end of the System/370 as the 3310 direct access storage. The OEM version was announced as the 0680 in September 1981. Developed at IBM's Hursley, UK, laboratory under the code name Piccolo with an initial capacity of up to 65MB, it used six 8-inch disks (210 mm) and had an improved rotary actuator.

A double capacity version, the 62SW, shipped in June 1984 but very few units were sold because its price per megabyte was the same as the 62GV.

=== IBM 0676 ===
The 0676 first shipped in November 1982 as a 5247 Disk Storage Unit for the IBM System/23 Datamaster. Developed at the IBM Rochester, Minnesota, laboratory as the 21ED it was an 8-inch HDD with an initial capacity of 15 or 30 MB in two or four 210 mm disks. In 1983 it shipped as the HDD in the 5360 System Unit of the S/36. In 1984 its capacity was doubled by doubling the number of tracks per surface and it was incorporated into the 5362 System Unit of the System/36.

=== IBM 0665 ===
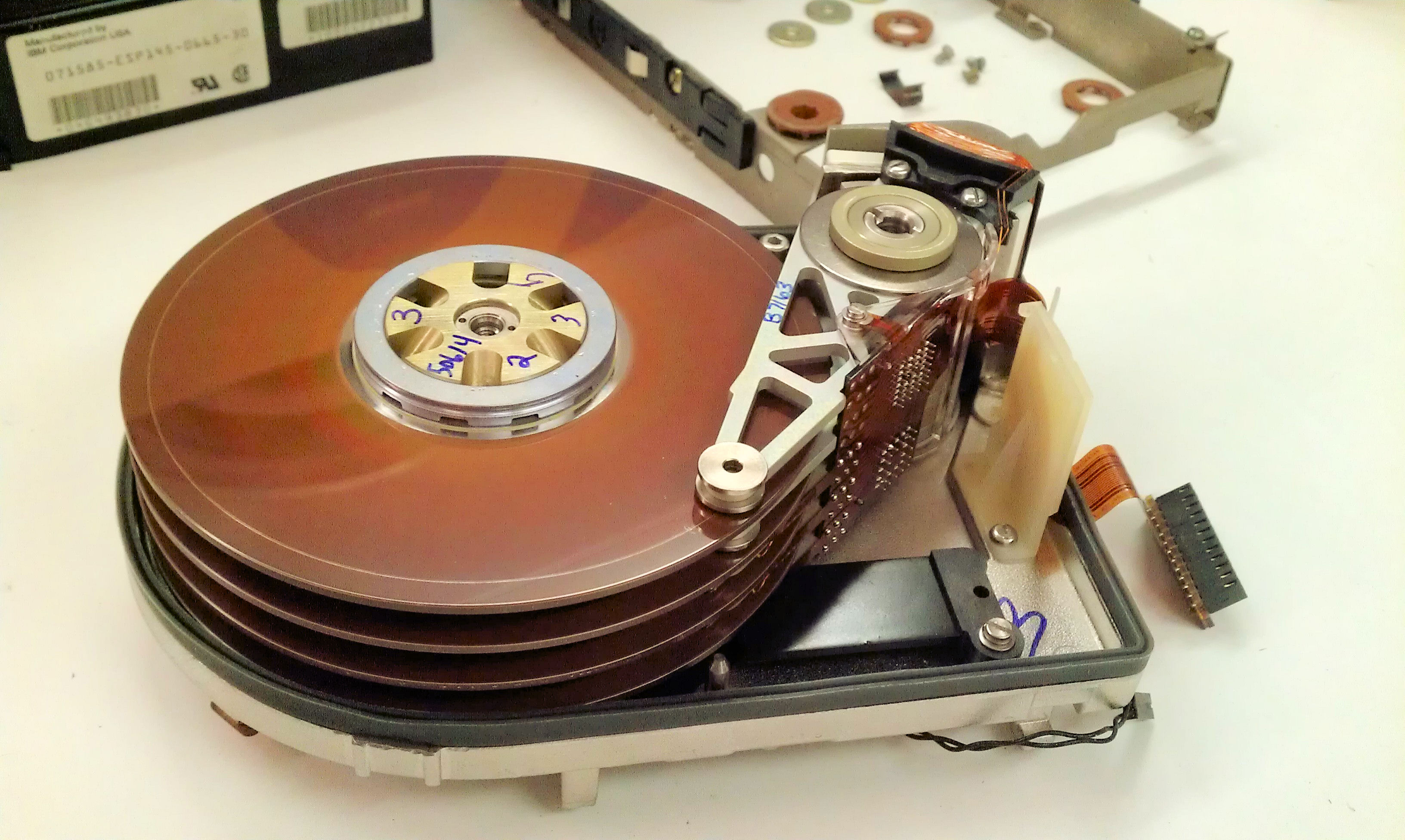
A British IBM 0665-30 hard disk exposed, possibly manufactured in 1985. A head crash has occurred.

The 0665 first shipped in October 1985 in the system unit for the PC AT (5170). Developed under the code name "Pixie" at IBM Rochester, Minnesota, it was a 5 1/4-inch HDD with capacities of 20, 30 and 44 MB.

=== IBM 0667 ===
The 0667 first shipped in August 1986. Developed at IBM Rochester, Minnesota, under the code name "Grant", it was a 70 MB ESDI full height 5 1/4-inch HDD with up to four 130 mm disks. It was offered as a feature on certain models of the PC RT (6150, 6151, 6152) and in System/36 Model System Units (5363, 5364).

=== IBM 0669 ===
The 0669 first shipped in 1987. Developed at IBM Rochester, Minnesota, under the code name "Grant-Prime", it was a full-height 5 1/2-inch HDD with a capacity of up to 115 MB on up to four 130 mm disks. It was the HDD internal to the System/36 5363 System Unit and Series 1 4956 System Unit.

=== IBM 0671 ===
The 0671 first shipped in 1987. Developed under the code name "Lee" at IBM Rochester, Minnesota, it was an up to 316 MB ESDI full height 5 1/4-inch HDD with up to eight 130 mm disks depending upon model. This was IBM's first usage of a thin metal film as the disk's recording surface. In 1988 it shipped as part of the 9404 System Unit of the IBM AS/400 system which contained two, or optionally three of these HDDs.

=== IBM 0661 ===
The 0661 first shipped in 1989 as the model 371. Developed initially under the code name "Lightning" at IBM Rochester Minnesota (and IBM Hursley, UK) as a 320 MB SCSI HDD with up to eight 95 mm disks (14 heads), it was followed in 1990 with a 400 MB version, code named "Turbo". During 1990 it was added as a standard drive on several major IBM systems, e.g., IBM AS/400 System Unit Model CXX.

=== IBM 0681 ===
The 0681 first shipped in April 1990. Developed at IBM's Hursley, UK, laboratory under the code name Redwing, it was the last HDD product developed at Hursley. It was an up to 857 MB full-height 5 1/4-inch HDD using up to 12 130 mm disks. It was the first HDD to use PRML decoding of data. It was the drive component of the 9333 Disk Drive Subsystem which first shipped in early 1992.

A higher density, 1.07 GB, version was incorporated into the 9333 subsystem in May 1992.

=== IBM 0663 ===
The 0663 first shipped in late 1991. Developed under the code name "Corsair", it was a 3 1/2-inch HDD with the height of a 5 1/2-inch half-height device (1.6-inch high) and up to 1 GB on up to 8 95 mm disks. It was offered as a feature on certain models of the PS/2 and RS/6000. It was the first OEM disk drive to use MR Heads.

=== IBM 0664 ===
The 0664 first shipped in November 1992. Developed under the code name "Allicat" at IBM Rochester, Minnesota, it was a full-height 5 1/2-inch HDD (3.25-inch high) that combined two 3 1/2-inch devices in one, with up to 2.013 GB capacity on up to 8 95 mm disks.

=== IBM 0662 ===
The 0662 first shipped in June 1993. Developed under the code name "Spitfire" at IBM Rochester, Minnesota, it was a full-height (1-inch high) 3 1/2-inch HDD with 1.05 GB on three disks or five disk surfaces. It was the HDD internal to the 9336 Disk Unit and the 9337 Disk Array.

== Floppy disk drive ==
Another important IBM innovation is the floppy disk drive. IBM first introduced the 8-inch FDD in 1971 as a read only microprogram load device. In 1973 IBM shipped its first read/write floppy disk drive as a part of the 3740 Data Entry System. IBM established early standards in 8" FDDs but never sold such products separately so that the industry then developed separate from IBM.

IBM was at one point was the world's largest purchaser of OEM 5 1/4-inch FDDs; its selection of the two-sided, 48 tracks-per-inch model helped establish the model as the de facto industry standard. IBM made extensive preparations to manufacture such models and smaller form factors but cancelled all such efforts in 1985. IBM's 1983 attempt to OEM its 4-inch DemiDisk failed.

== "Star" series of HDDs ==
On October 17, 1994, IBM's Storage Systems division announced three new families of hard disk drives, the Travelstar 2 1/2-inch family for notebooks, the Deskstar 3 1/2-inch family for desktop applications and the Ultrastar 3 1/2-inch family for high performance computer system applications.

== IBM's first HDD versus its last HDDs ==
The following table compares IBM's first HDD, the RAMAC 350, with the last three models it manufactured in each of its "Star" series of OEM HDDs. It illustrates HDD's spectacular decline in cost and size along with corresponding improvement in capacity and performance.

Parameter (units)	RAMAC 350	Ultrastar 146Z10	Deskstar 180GXP	Travelstar 80GN	46-year improvement (maximum)
Announced	Sep 1956	Jul 2002	Oct 2002	Nov 2002	
Capacity (gigabytes)	0.004	146	180	80	48,000
Dimensions (inches)	60×68×29	4×1×5.75	4×1×5.75	2.75×0.38×3.95	
Dimensions (mm)	1500×1700×700	102×25×146	102×25×146	70×9.5×100	
Volume (in³)	118,320	23	23	4	29,161
Volume (litres)	1,939	0.4	0.4	0.1	
Weight (lbs)	2,140	1.7	1.4	0.2	1,244
Weight (kg)	971	0.8	0.64	0.095	
Power (watts)	8100 BTUs/hour (i.e., 2374 watts), up to 5500 VA depending upon model	16	10.3	1.85	1,283
Power density (megabytes/watt)	0.0016	9,125	17,476	43,243	27,375,856
List price (US$)	$34,500 ($234,000 in 2002 dollars)	1200	360	420	
Price/megabyte (US$)	$9,200 ($68,000 in 2002 dollars)	0.0082	0.0020	0.0053	4,600,000 (34,000,000 in 2002 dollars)
Density (megabits/in²)	0.002	26,263	46,300	70,000	35,000,000
Density (kilobits/mm²)	0.003	40,708	71,765	108,500	
Volume density (gigabytes/in³)	0.00000003	6	8	20	622,100,131
Volume density (megabytes/cm³)	0.000002	388	478	1,203	
Latency (ms)	25	3	4	7	8
Average seek time (ms)	600	5.9	10.2	12	102
Data rate (megabytes/s)	0.001	103	29.4	43.75	11,719

== DASD devices not HDDs or FDDs ==
IBM in some of its operating systems classifies HDDs and FDDs as DASDs, direct access storage devices. Other technologies so classified include:

=== IBM 7320 drum ===
The IBM 7320 is a magnetic-drum storage unit announced in 1962.

=== IBM 2301 drum ===
The IBM 2301 is a magnetic-drum storage device introduced in the late 1960s

=== IBM 2303 drum ===
The IBM 2303 is a magnetic-drum storage device introduced in 1964.

=== IBM 2321 Data Cell ===
The IBM 2321 Data Cell announced in 1964 is a device that uses short strips of magnetic tape to store data. It holds 10 40 MB removable cells, for a total capacity of 400 MB.

=== IBM 3850 Mass Storage System ===
The IBM 3850 Mass Storage System, announced in 1974, is a library system of tape cartridges that staged data from the cartridges onto physical IBM 3330 or 3350 disk drives which then appeared to the system as virtual 3330 drives.

== See also ==
- History of the floppy disk
- History of hard disk drives
- List of IBM products
