= B2D =

B2D may refer to:

- Business-to-developer
- Business-to-dealer; see business-to-business
- Bipolar II disorder
- Backup-to-disk
- Born to Die, 2012 album by Lana Del Rey
