= Boot signature =

Boot signature may refer to:

- VBR boot signature, a signature in IBM PC compatible floppy and superfloppy boot sectors (Volume Boot Records)
- MBR boot signature, a signature in IBM PC compatible fixed disk and removable drive boot sectors (Master Boot Records)
