= Crash-only software =

Computer programs that handles failure by restarting

A crash-only software is a computer program that handle failures by simply restarting, without attempting any sophisticated recovery. Correctly written components of crash-only software can microreboot to a known-good state without the help of a user. A related recovery technique is the microreboot, which restarts only a faulty fine-grained component rather than rebooting the whole application or server; in an Internet auction application, Candea et al. reported that microreboots recovered most of the same failures as full reboots while reducing recovery time and lost work by about an order of magnitude. Since failure-handling and normal startup use the same methods, this can increase the chance that bugs in failure-handling code will be noticed, except when there are leftover artifacts, such as data corruption from a severe failure, that do not occur during normal startup.

Crash-only software also has benefits for end-users. All too often, applications do not save their data and settings while running, only at the end of their use. For example, word processors usually save settings when they are closed. A crash-only application is designed to save all changed user settings soon after they are changed, so that the persistent state matches that of the running machine. No matter how an application terminates (be it a clean close or the sudden failure of a laptop battery), the state will persist.

== See also ==
- Autosave – Automatic saving function
- End-to-end principle – Design principle for computer networking
- Erlang (programming language) § "Let it crash" coding style
