= Disk-based backup =

Disk-based backup refers to technology that allows one to back up large amounts of data to a disk storage unit. It is often supplemented by tape drives for data archival or replication to another facility for disaster recovery. Backup-to-disk is a popular in enterprise use for both technical and business reasons. Storage devices have gotten faster access time and higher storage capacity. There are different forms of disks used for back up, standard mechanical disks and solid state disks.

== Technical Advantages ==
There are technical advantages to backup-to-disk technology. One of the main advantages is the speed at which backups can be performed to the disk appliance. Backing up data to a backup-to-disk technology can be up to four times faster than traditional SCSI tape devices. While the new Serial Attached SCSI (SAS) connected tape drives are faster than the original tape drives, the disk appliance is still faster than most tape technologies. These faster backup times lead to shorter backup windows allowing the technology to backup the data while in a smaller amount of time thus increasing the window for processing which is also a benefit for the business.

Another advantage that backup-to-disk offers is data deduplication and compression. The disk appliances offer either de-duplication at the source or at the destination. The deduplication at the destination is faster and requires less performance overhead on the source host. The deduplication requires less disk space on the disk appliance as it stores only one copy of the possible multiple copies of one file on the network.

Many of the backup-to-disk technologies advertise up to 15 to 1 compression ratios. This also allows the information technology department to store more data on less disk space. With deduplication a disk appliance with 5 terabytes of raw disk space can store as much as 30 terabytes of compressed and de-duplicated data.

== Business Advantages ==
=== Disaster Recovery ===
The most important advantage that backup-to-disk provides for the business, and for the technology department, is faster recovery of the data. Most businesses today have several terabytes of data that the business must be able to retain in the event of a disaster. This disaster can be as simple as server hardware failures to as severe as a regional disaster, such as a natural disaster. For the localized disaster the disk appliance allows the technology department to hold one or two weeks of backups, depending on the size of the disk appliance and the amount of data being backup, which allows for very quick recovery.

=== Business Continuity ===
Preparation for disaster requires the creation of an organizational Business Continuity Plan (BCP). The BCP describes the guidelines for system continuity and recoverability. Disk based backups facilitate rapid system recovery. A backup-to-disk system can replicate data backups to a device at another location. This can be beneficial if the organization has designated the location as the recovery site. Backup-to-disk technology can greatly benefit an organization in continuing to do business if a disaster damages facilities and technology.

== Products ==
There are several Disk Backup solutions on the market today. Below are a few of the industry leading devices.

=== Dell EMC ===
Dell EMC offers two disk backup devices. The Data Domain device, which EMC acquired from Data Domain in 2009. The Data Domain device de-duplicates the data at the destination, which reduces the overhead on the host. With throughput up to 68 TB/hour, Data Domain systems make it possible to complete more backups in less time and provide faster, more reliable restores. The Data Domain Operating System (DD OS) is the intelligence behind Data Domain systems that makes them the industry’s most reliable and cloud-enabled protection storage.

The second Dell EMC offering is Avamar: this unit de-duplicates data at the source via an agent on the host which offers savings on bandwidth utilization during backup.

Both of these units offer site-to-site replication.

=== HPE ===
Hewlett Packard Enterprise (HPE) offers data storage backup with its HPE StoreOnce portfolio. HPE StoreOnce can be offered as a virtual storage appliance (VSA) or a disk-based hardware appliance. The StoreOnce VSA is licensed at 4 TB, 10 TB and 50 TB capacity points and can be deployed on any x86 Industry Standard Server with certain specification requirements. The disk based StoreOnce Backup appliances have six models ranging from a StoreOnce 3100 (5.5TB usable) to a StoreOnce 6500 (1.7PB usable).

HPE StoreOnce with HPE StoreOnce Catalyst is the only federated deduplication solution, and it provides disk-based backup for IT environments, from the smallest remote sites to the largest enterprises. You can reduce the amount of space needed to store backup data by 95% and choose between powerful dedicated appliances for larger offices and data centers, and flexible virtual appliances for smaller and remote offices.

=== Quantum ===
Quantum offers several models for disk backup solutions. The DXi-V series is an entry-level unit that stores from 1-2TB of data. The midrange level units are the DXi4000 and DXI6000series, while the enterprise level unit is the DXi8500.

All of the offerings from Quantum have de-duplication, compression, and remote site replication.

=== Rdiff-backup ===
Rdiff-backup is an open-source product that provides reverse-delta disk-to-disk backups.

=== Rsync-incremental ===
Rsync-incremental is not a product per se but rather a technique using the open-source program Rsync with the—link-dest parameter. This functionality is very similar to Time Machine on macOS.

=== Time Machine ===
On macOS, Time Machine provides a disk-to-disk backup solution to create incremental backups of files that can be restored at later dates.

== See also ==
- Backup
- Disk-to-disk-to-tape
- Disk storage
