= BIOS parameter block =

Data structure in the volume boot record

In computing, the BIOS parameter block, often shortened to BPB, is a data structure in the volume boot record (VBR) describing the physical layout of a data storage volume. On partitioned devices, such as hard disks, the BPB describes the volume partition, whereas, on unpartitioned devices, such as floppy disks, it describes the entire medium. A basic BPB can appear and be used on any partition, including floppy disks where its presence is often necessary; however, certain filesystems also make use of it in describing basic filesystem structures. Filesystems making use of a BIOS parameter block include FAT12 (except for in DOS 1.x), FAT16, FAT32, HPFS, and NTFS. Due to different types of fields and the amount of data they contain, the length of the BPB is different for FAT16, FAT32, and NTFS boot sectors. (A detailed discussion of the various FAT BPB versions and their entries can be found in the FAT article.) Combined with the 11-byte data structure at the very start of volume boot records immediately preceding the BPB or EBPB, this is also called FDC descriptor or extended FDC descriptor in ECMA-107 or ISO/IEC 9293 (which describes FAT as for flexible/floppy and optical disk cartridges).

== FAT12 / FAT16 ==
=== DOS 2.0 BPB ===
Format of standard DOS 2.0 BPB for FAT12 (13 bytes):

Sector offset	BPB offset	Field length	Description
0x00B	0x00	WORD	Bytes per logical sector
0x00D	0x02	BYTE	Logical sectors per cluster
0x00E	0x03	WORD	Reserved logical sectors
0x010	0x05	BYTE	Number of FATs
0x011	0x06	WORD	Root directory entries
0x013	0x08	WORD	Total logical sectors
0x015	0x0A	BYTE	Media descriptor
0x016	0x0B	WORD	Logical sectors per FAT

Not all versions of DOS 2.00 conform to this structure. IBM PC-DOS 2.00 has additional, undocumented fields in this space that seems to indicate the bootable drive and the sector from where to start reading. This does not appear in any official IBM documentation but a PC/XT system will not boot without correct values in these bytes.

=== DOS 3.0 BPB ===
Format of standard DOS 3.0 BPB for FAT12 and FAT16 (19 bytes), already supported by some versions of MS-DOS 2.11:

Sector offset	BPB offset	Field length	Description
0x00B	0x00	13 BYTEs	DOS 2.0 BPB
0x018	0x0D	WORD	Physical sectors per track
0x01A	0x0F	WORD	Number of heads
0x01C	0x11	WORD	Hidden sectors (incompatible with DOS 3.31 BPB)

=== DOS 3.2 BPB ===
Format of standard DOS 3.2 BPB for FAT12 and FAT16 (21 bytes):

Sector offset	BPB offset	Field length	Description
0x00B	0x00	19 BYTEs	DOS 3.0 BPB
0x01E	0x13	WORD	Total sectors (incompatible with DOS 3.31 BPB)

=== DOS 3.31 BPB ===
Format of standard DOS 3.31 BPB for FAT12, FAT16 and FAT16B (25 bytes):

Sector offset	BPB offset	Field length	Description
0x00B	0x00	13 BYTEs	DOS 2.0 BPB
0x018	0x0D	WORD	Physical sectors per track (identical to DOS 3.0 BPB)
0x01A	0x0F	WORD	Number of heads (identical to DOS 3.0 BPB)
0x01C	0x11	DWORD	Hidden sectors (incompatible with DOS 3.0 BPB)
0x020	0x15	DWORD	Large total logical sectors

=== DOS 3.4 EBPB ===
Format of PC DOS 3.4 and OS/2 1.0-1.1 Extended BPB for FAT12, FAT16 and FAT16B (32 bytes):

Sector offset	BPB offset	Field length	Description
0x00B	0x00	25 BYTEs	DOS 3.31 BPB
0x024	0x19	BYTE	Physical drive number
0x025	0x1A	BYTE	Flags etc.
0x026	0x1B	BYTE	Extended boot signature (0x28 aka "4.0") (similar to DOS 4.0 EBPB and NTFS EBPB)
0x027	0x1C	DWORD	Volume serial number

== FAT12 / FAT16 / HPFS ==
=== DOS 4.0 EBPB ===
Format of DOS 4.0 and OS/2 1.2 Extended BPB for FAT12, FAT16, FAT16B and HPFS (51 bytes):

Sector offset	BPB offset	Field length	Description
0x00B	0x00	25 BYTEs	DOS 3.31 BPB
0x024	0x19	BYTE	Physical drive number (identical to DOS 3.4 EBPB)
0x025	0x1A	BYTE	Flags etc. (identical to DOS 3.4 EBPB)
0x026	0x1B	BYTE	Extended boot signature (0x29 aka "4.1") (similar to DOS 3.4 EBPB and NTFS EBPB)
0x027	0x1C	DWORD	Volume serial number (identical to DOS 3.4 EBPB)
0x02B	0x20	11 BYTEs	Volume label
0x036	0x2B	8 BYTEs	File-system type

== FAT32 ==
=== DOS 7.1 EBPB ===
Format of short DOS 7.1 Extended BIOS Parameter Block (60 bytes) for FAT32:

Sector offset	BPB offset	Field length	Description
0x00B	0x00	25 BYTEs	DOS 3.31 BPB
0x024	0x19	DWORD	Logical sectors per FAT
0x028	0x1D	WORD	Mirroring flags etc.
0x02A	0x1F	WORD	Version
0x02C	0x21	DWORD	Root directory cluster
0x030	0x25	WORD	Location of FS Information Sector
0x032	0x27	WORD	Location of backup sector(s)
0x034	0x29	12 BYTEs	Reserved (Boot file name)
0x040	0x35	BYTE	Physical drive number
0x041	0x36	BYTE	Flags etc.
0x042	0x37	BYTE	Extended boot signature (0x28)
0x043	0x38	DWORD	Volume serial number

Format of full DOS 7.1 Extended BIOS Parameter Block (79 bytes) for FAT32:

Sector offset	BPB offset	Field length	Description
0x00B	0x00	25 BYTEs	DOS 3.31 BPB
0x024	0x19	DWORD	Logical sectors per FAT
0x028	0x1D	WORD	Mirroring flags etc.
0x02A	0x1F	WORD	Version
0x02C	0x21	DWORD	Root directory cluster
0x030	0x25	WORD	Location of FS Information Sector
0x032	0x27	WORD	Location of backup sector(s)
0x034	0x29	12 BYTEs	Reserved (Boot file name)
0x040	0x35	BYTE	Physical drive number
0x041	0x36	BYTE	Flags etc.
0x042	0x37	BYTE	Extended boot signature (0x29)
0x043	0x38	DWORD	Volume serial number
0x047	0x3C	11 BYTEs	Volume label
0x052	0x47	8 BYTEs	File-system type

== NTFS ==
Format of Extended BPB for NTFS (73 bytes):

Sector offset	BPB offset	Field length	Description
0x00B	0x00	25 BYTEs	DOS 3.31 BPB
0x024	0x19	BYTE	Physical drive number (identical to DOS 3.4 EBPB)
0x025	0x1A	BYTE	Flags etc. (identical to DOS 3.4 EBPB)
0x026	0x1B	BYTE	Extended boot signature (0x80 aka "8.0") (similar to DOS 3.4 EBPB and DOS 4.0 EBPB)
0x027	0x1C	BYTE	Reserved
0x028	0x1D	QWORD	Sectors in volume
0x030	0x25	QWORD	MFT first cluster number
0x038	0x2D	QWORD	MFT mirror first cluster number
0x040	0x35	DWORD	MFT record size
0x044	0x39	DWORD	Index block size
0x048	0x3D	QWORD	Volume serial number
0x050	0x45	DWORD	Checksum

== exFAT BPB ==
exFAT does not use a BPB in the classic sense. Nevertheless, the volume boot record in sector 0 is organized similarly to BPBs.

Sector offset	Field length (bytes)	Description
0x000	3	JumpBoot. Must be 0xEB, 0x76, 0x90.
0x003	8	Filesystem name. Must be "EXFAT ".
0x00B	53	Blank (traditional BPB area). Must be all zero.

== See also ==
- BPB formats in the FAT file systems
