= Rawdisk =

In computing, the term raw disk, often referred to as raw, is used to refer to hard disk access at a raw, binary level, beneath the file system level, and using partition data at the MBR.

A notable example is in the context of platform virtualization, and a feature of certain virtualization software is the ability to access a hard disk at the raw level. Virtualization software may typically function via the usage of a virtual drive format like OVF, but some users may want the virtualization software to be able to run an operating system that has been installed on another disk or disk partition. In order to do this, the virtualization software must allow raw disk access to that disk or disk partition, and then allow that entire operating system to boot within the virtualization window.

== File system ==
RAW file system indicates a state of a hard drive which has no or unknown file system. A disk or drive with a RAW file system is also known as RAW disk or RAW drive. When a hard drive or external storage device is shown as RAW, it could be:

- The file system of the drive is missing or damaged
- The RAW drive has not been formatted with a file system
- The current file system of the storage medium is not recognized by the computer
