= Booting process of Linux =

Multi-stage initialisation process of operating system

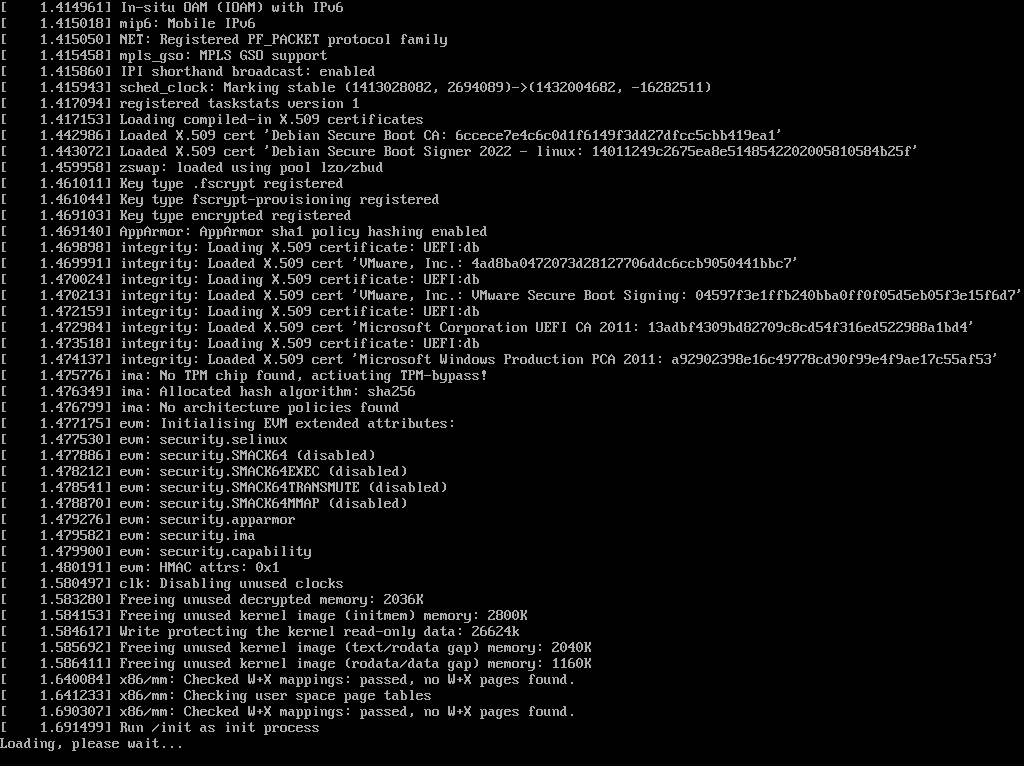
Linux kernel 6.1 booting on Debian Bookworm

The Linux booting process involves multiple stages and is in many ways similar to the BSD and other Unix-style boot processes, from which it is derived. Although the Linux booting process depends very much on the computer architecture, those architectures share similar stages and software components, including system startup, bootloader execution, loading and startup of a Linux kernel image, and execution of various startup scripts and daemons. Those are grouped into 4 steps: system startup, bootloader stage, kernel stage, and init process.

When a Linux system is powered up or reset, its processor will execute a specific firmware/program for system initialization, such as the power-on self-test, invoking the reset vector to start a program at a known address in flash/ROM (in embedded Linux devices), then load the bootloader into RAM for later execution. In IBM PC–compatible personal computers (PCs), this firmware/program is either a BIOS or a UEFI monitor, and is stored in the mainboard. In embedded Linux systems, this firmware/program is called boot ROM. After being loaded into RAM, the bootloader (also called first-stage bootloader or primary bootloader) will execute to load the second-stage bootloader (also called secondary bootloader). The second-stage bootloader will load the kernel image into memory, decompress and initialize it, and then pass control to this kernel image. The second-stage bootloader also performs several operations on the system such as system hardware check, mounting the root device, loading the necessary kernel modules, etc. Finally, the first user-space process (init process) starts, and other high-level system initializations are performed (which involve with startup scripts).

For each of these stages and components, there are different variations and approaches; for example, GRUB, systemd-boot, coreboot or Das U-Boot can be used as bootloaders (historical examples are LILO, SYSLINUX or Loadlin), while the startup scripts can be either traditional init-style, or the system configuration can be performed through modern alternatives such as systemd or runit.

== System startup ==
System startup has different steps based on the hardware that Linux is being booted on.

IBM PC compatible hardware is one architecture Linux is commonly used on; on these systems, the BIOS or UEFI firmware plays an important role.

In BIOS systems, the BIOS will respectively perform power-on self test (POST), which is to check the system hardware, then enumerate local device and finally initialize the system. For system initialization, BIOS will start by searching for the bootable device on the system which stores the OS. A bootable device can be storage devices like floppy disk, CD-ROM, USB flash drive, a partition on a hard disk (where a hard disk stores multiple OS, e.g Windows and Fedora), a storage device on local network, etc. A hard disk to boot Linux stores the Master Boot Record (MBR), which contains the first-stage/primary bootloader in order to be loaded into RAM.

In UEFI systems, the Linux kernel can be executed directly by UEFI firmware via the EFI boot stub, but usually uses GRUB 2 or systemd-boot as a bootloader.

If UEFI Secure Boot is supported, a "shim" or "Preloader" is often booted by the UEFI before the bootloader or EFI-stub-bearing kernel. Even if UEFI Secure Boot is disabled this may be present and booted in case it is later enabled. It merely acts to add an extra signing key database providing keys for signature verification of subsequent boot stages without modifying the UEFI key database, and chains to the subsequent boot step the same as the UEFI would have.

The system startup stage on embedded Linux system starts by executing the firmware / program on the on-chip boot ROM, which then load bootloader / operating system from the storage device like eMMC, eUFS, NAND flash, etc. The sequences of system startup varies by processors but all include hardware initialization and system hardware testing steps. For example in a system with an i.MX7D processor and a bootable device which stores the OS (including U-Boot), the on-chip boot ROM sets up the DDR memory controller at first which allows the boot ROM's program to obtain the SoC configuration data from the external bootloader on the bootable device. The on-chip boot ROM then loads the U-Boot into DRAM for the bootloader stage.

== Bootloader stage ==
In IBM PC compatibles using a BIOS, the first stage bootloader, which is a part of the master boot record (MBR), is a 512-byte image containing the vendor-specific program code and a partition table. As mentioned earlier in the introduction part, the first stage bootloader will find and load the second stage bootloader. It does this by searching in the partition table for an active partition. After finding an active partition, first stage bootloader will keep scanning the remaining partitions in the table to ensure that they're all inactive. After this step, the active partition's boot record is read into RAM and executed as the second stage bootloader. The job of the second stage bootloader is to load the Linux kernel image into memory, and optional initial RAM disk. Kernel image isn't an executable kernel, but a "compressed file" of the kernel instead, compressed into either zImage or bzImage formats with zlib.

In those systems, the first- and second-stage bootloaders are usually provided by the GRand Unified Bootloader (GRUB), and formerly provided by the Linux Loader (LILO). GRUB 2, which is now used, differs from GRUB 1 by being capable of automatic detection of various operating systems and automatic configuration. The stage1 is loaded and executed by the BIOS from the MBR. The intermediate stage loader (stage1.5, usually core.img) is loaded and executed by the stage1 loader. The second-stage loader (stage2, the /boot/grub/ files) is loaded by the stage1.5 and displays the GRUB startup menu that allows the user to choose an operating system or examine and edit startup parameters. After a menu entry is chosen and optional parameters are given, GRUB loads the linux kernel into memory and passes control to it. GRUB 2 is also capable of chain-loading of another bootloader.

In UEFI systems, the stage1 and stage1.5 usually are the same UEFI application file (such as grubx64.efi for x64 UEFI systems).

Beside GRUB, there are some more popular bootloaders:

- systemd-boot (formerly Gummiboot), a bootloader included with systemd that requires minimal configuration (for UEFI systems only).
- SYSLINUX/ISOLINUX is a bootloader that specializes in booting full Linux installations from FAT filesystems. It is often used for boot or rescue floppy discs, live USBs, and other lightweight boot systems. ISOLINUX is generally used by Linux live CDs and bootable install CDs.
- rEFInd, a boot manager for UEFI systems.
- coreboot is a free implementation of the UEFI or BIOS and usually deployed with the system board, and field upgrades provided by the vendor if need be. Parts of coreboot becomes the systems BIOS and stays resident in memory after boot.
- Das U-Boot is a bootloader for embedded systems. It is used on systems that do not have a BIOS/UEFI but rather employ custom methods to read the bootloader into memory and execute it.

Historical bootloaders, no longer in common use, include:

- LILO does not understand or parse filesystem layout. Instead, a configuration file (/etc/lilo.conf) is created in a live system which maps raw offset information (mapper tool) about location of kernel and ram disks (initrd or initramfs). The configuration file, which includes data such as boot partition and kernel pathname for each, as well as customized options if needed, is then written together with bootloader code into MBR bootsector. When this bootsector is read and given control by BIOS, LILO loads the menu code and draws it then uses stored values together with user input to calculate and load the Linux kernel or chain-load any other boot-loader.
- GRUB 1 includes logic to read common file systems at run-time in order to access its configuration file. This gives GRUB 1 ability to read its configuration file from the filesystem rather than have it embedded into the MBR, which allows it to change the configuration at run-time and specify disks and partitions in a human-readable format rather than relying on offsets. It also contains a command-line interface, which makes it easier to fix or modify GRUB if it is misconfigured or corrupt.
- Loadlin is a bootloader that can replace a running DOS or Windows 9x kernel with the Linux kernel at run time. This can be useful in the case of hardware that needs to be switched on via software and for which such configuration programs are proprietary and only available for DOS. This booting method is less necessary nowadays, as Linux has drivers for a multitude of hardware devices, but it has seen some use in mobile devices. Another use case is when the Linux is located on a storage device which is not available to the BIOS for booting: DOS or Windows can load the appropriate drivers to make up for the BIOS limitation and boot Linux from there.

== Kernel ==
The kernel stage occurs after the bootloader stage. The Linux kernel handles all operating system processes, such as memory management, task scheduling, I/O, interprocess communication, and overall system control. The kernel is loaded in two stages. In the first stage, the kernel (as a compressed image file) is loaded into memory and decompressed, and a few fundamental functions are set up such as basic memory management and a minimal amount of hardware setup. The kernel image is self-decompressed, which is a part of the kernel image's routine. For some platforms (like ARM 64-bit), kernel decompression has to be performed by the bootloader instead. One example of a bootloader that does this is U-Boot.

For details of those steps, take an example with an i386 microprocessor. When its bzImage (the compressed kernel image) is invoked, the function start() (of ./arch/i386/boot/head.S) is called to do some basic hardware setup. This function then calls startup_32() (located in ./arch/i386/boot/compressed/head.S). startup_32()will do basic setup to environment (stack, etc.), clears the Block Started by Symbol (BSS) then invokes decompress_kernel() (located in ./arch/i386/boot/compressed/misc.c) to decompress the kernel. Kernel startup is then executed via a different startup_32() function located in ./arch/i386/kernel/head.S. The startup function startup_32() for the kernel (also called the swapper or process 0) establishes memory management (paging tables and memory paging), detects the type of CPU and any additional functionality such as floating point capabilities, and then switches to non-architecture specific Linux kernel functionality via a call to start_kernel() located in ./init/main.c.

start_kernel()executes a wide range of initialization functions. It sets up interrupt handling (IRQs), further configures memory, mounts the initial RAM disk ("initrd") that was loaded previously as the temporary root file system during the bootloader stage. The initrd, which acts as a temporary root filesystem in RAM, allows the kernel to be fully booted and driver modules to be loaded directly from memory, without reliance upon other devices (e.g. a hard disk). initrd usually contains the necessary modules needed to interface with storage peripherals, e.g SATA driver, and support a large number of possible hardware configurations. This split of some drivers statically compiled into the kernel and other drivers loaded from initrd allows for a smaller kernel. initramfs, also known as early user space, has been available since version 2.5.46 of the Linux kernel, with the intent to replace as many functions as possible that previously the kernel would have performed during the startup process. Typical uses of early user space are to detect what device drivers are needed to load the main user space file system and load them from a temporary filesystem. Many distributions use dracut to generate and maintain the initramfs image.

The root file system is later switched via a call to pivot_root() which unmounts the temporary root file system and replaces it with the use of the real one, once the latter is accessible. The memory used by the temporary root file system is then reclaimed.

Finally, kernel_thread (in arch/i386/kernel/process.c) is called to start the Init process (the first user-space process), and then starts the idle task via cpu_idle().

Thus, the kernel stage initializes devices, mounts the root filesystem specified by the bootloader as read only, and runs Init (/sbin/init) which is designated as the first process run by the system (PID = 1). A message is printed by the kernel upon mounting the file system, and by Init upon starting the Init process.

According to Red Hat, the detailed kernel process at this stage is therefore summarized as follows:

"When the kernel is loaded, it immediately initializes and configures the computer's memory and configures the various hardware attached to the system, including all processors, I/O subsystems, and storage devices. It then looks for the compressed initrd image in a predetermined location in memory, decompresses it, mounts it, and loads all necessary drivers. Next, it initializes virtual devices related to the file system, such as LVM or software RAID before unmounting the initrd disk image and freeing up all the memory the disk image once occupied. The kernel then creates a root device, mounts the root partition read-only, and frees any unused memory. At this point, the kernel is loaded into memory and operational. However, since there are no user applications that allow meaningful input to the system, not much can be done with it." An initramfs-style boot is similar, but not identical to the described initrd boot.

At this point, with interrupts enabled, the scheduler can take control of the overall management of the system, to provide pre-emptive multi-tasking, and the init process is left to continue booting the user environment in user space.

== Init process ==
Once the kernel has started, it starts the init process, a daemon which then bootstraps the user space, for example by checking and mounting file systems, and starts up other processes. The init system is the first daemon to start (during booting) and the last daemon to terminate (during shutdown).

Historically this was the "SysV init", which was just called "init". More recent Linux distributions are likely to use one of the more modern alternatives such as systemd. Below is a summary of the main init processes:

- SysV init (a.k.a. simply "init") is similar to the init process of UNIX System V. In a standard Linux system, init is executed with a parameter, known as a runlevel, which takes a value from 0 to 6 and determines which subsystems are made operational. Each runlevel has its own scripts which codify the various processes involved in setting up or leaving the given runlevel, and it is these scripts which are referenced as necessary in the boot process. Init scripts are typically held in directories with names such as "/etc/rc...". The top level configuration file for init is at /etc/inittab. During system boot, it checks whether a default runlevel is specified in /etc/inittab, and requests the runlevel to enter via the system console if not. It then proceeds to run all the relevant boot scripts for the given runlevel, including loading modules, checking the integrity of the root file system (which was mounted read-only) and then remounting it for full read-write access, and sets up the network. After it has spawned all of the processes specified, init goes dormant, and waits for one of three events to happen: processes that started to end or die, a power failure signal, or a request via /sbin/telinit to further change the runlevel.
- systemd is a modern alternative to SysV init. Like init, systemd is a daemon that manages other daemons. All daemons, including systemd, are background processes. Lennart Poettering and Kay Sievers, software engineers that initially developed systemd, sought to surpass the efficiency of the init daemon in several ways. They wanted to improve the software framework for expressing dependencies, to allow more processing to be done in parallel during system booting, and to reduce the computational overhead of the shell. Systemd's initialization instructions for each daemon are recorded in a declarative configuration file rather than a shell script. For inter-process communication, systemd makes Unix domain sockets and D-Bus available to the running daemons. Systemd is also capable of aggressive parallelization.

== See also ==
- SYSLINUX
- Booting process of Android devices
- Booting process of macOS
- Booting process of Windows
