= Comparison of bootloaders =

Different bootloaders

The following tables compare general and technical information for a number of available bootloaders.

== General information ==
Name	Developer / Publisher	Current version	Initial release date	Latest release date	License	Cost	Website / documentation
Acronis OS Selector	Acronis International GmbH	Discontinued	?	?	Proprietary	$49.95 (personal use) $79.99 (commercial, per seat) $299.99 (server)	Official website
Barebox	Sascha Hauer the barebox community	v2026.04.0 LTS	December 24, 2009	?	GPL-2.0-only	No cost	Official website
BootManager	?	?	?	?	MIT	No cost	?
BootX (Apple)	Apple Inc.	?	?	?	Proprietary	bundled with macOS	?
BootX (Linux)	Benjamin Herrenschmidt	?	?	?	Proprietary	No cost	?
Clover (fork of rEFIt)	Slice and others	5157	October 3, 2013	29 June 2024	GPLv2/BSD-2-Clause	No cost	Official website Source repository
Das U-Boot	DENX Software Engineering	2026.04		6 April 2026	GPL-2.0-or-later	No cost	Official website
GRUB Legacy	GNU Project			8 May 2005	GPL-2.0-or-later	No cost	
GNU GRUB	GNU Project	2.14	1995	14 January 2026	GPL-3.0-or-later	No cost	Official website
Grub2Win	Drummerdp	2.4.2.4	2010	April 2, 2025	GPLv3	No cost	Official website
GRUB4DOS				31 March 2009	GPL-2.0-only (Note: While most parts of GRUB4DOS are under GPL-2.0-or-later, the whole software is limited to GPL-2.0-only due to incorporating some code from Linux.)		Official website
iBoot	Apple Inc.	iBoot-11881.62.2~1	June 29, 2007	December 9, 2024	Proprietary		
LILO					BSD-3-Clause		
Limine	mintsuki	12.9.4	April 6, 2020	19 October 2026	BSD-2-Clause	No cost	Official website
loadlin					GPL-2.0-or-later		
NTLDR	Microsoft		July 27, 1993 (Windows NT 3.1)		Proprietary	bundled with Windows	
RedBoot					GPL-2.0-or-later (eCos license)		
rEFInd (fork of rEFIt)	Roderick W. Smith	0.14.4.2	March 14, 2012	6 April 2024	GPL-3.0-or-later/BSD-3-Clause	No cost	Official website
rEFIt	Christoph Pfisterer	0.14	March 2, 2006	7 March 2010	GPL-2.0-or-later/BSD-3-Clause	No cost	Official website
SYSLINUX				6 October 2014	GPL-2.0-or-later		
systemd-boot / Gummiboot					LGPL-2.1-or-later		
TianoCore EDK II					BSD-2-Clause		
Windows Boot Manager	Microsoft		January 30, 2007 (Windows Vista)		Proprietary	bundled with Windows	
wolfBoot	wolfSSL	2.9.0	December 14, 2015	July 2, 2026	LGPL-3.0-or-later		Official website
XOSL				20 August 2002	GPL-2.0-only		

== Technical information ==
Note: The column MBR (Master Boot Record) refers to whether or not the boot loader can be stored in the first sector of a mass storage device. The column VBR (Volume Boot Record) refers to the ability of the boot loader to be stored in the first sector of any partition on a mass storage device.

=== Storage medium support ===
Name	Can reside in				Can boot from							
Name	ESP (UEFI)	MBR	VBR	Floppy	Hard disk	Second hard disk	Logical partitions	CD-ROM	Floppy	USB	Zip	LAN
Acronis OS Selector	?	?	?	Yes	Yes	Yes	Yes	Yes	Yes	Yes	Yes	?
Barebox	Yes	Yes	No	?	Yes	Yes	Yes	Yes	Yes	Yes	No	Yes
BootKey	?	No	No	Yes	No	No	No	Yes	Yes	Yes	No	No
BootManager	?	Yes	No	No	Yes	?	?	?	?	?	?	No
BootX (Apple)	Yes	No	No	No	Yes	No	No	Yes	No	Yes	Yes	Yes
BootX (Linux)	No	No	No	Yes	Yes	Yes	No	Yes	Yes	Yes	Yes	Yes
Das U-Boot	Yes	Yes	?	?	Yes	Yes	Yes	Yes	Yes	Yes	No	Yes
GRUB Legacy	No	Yes	Yes	Yes	Yes	Yes	Yes	Yes	Yes	Yes	Yes	Yes
GNU GRUB	Yes	Yes	Yes	Yes	Yes	Yes	Yes	Yes	Yes	Yes	Yes	Yes
GRUB4DOS	?	No	Yes	Yes	Yes	Yes	Yes	Yes	Yes	Yes	Yes	Yes
iBoot	Yes	?	?	?	Yes	?	?	No	?	?	?	?
LILO	Yes	Yes	Yes	Yes	Yes	Yes	Yes	Yes	Yes	Yes	Yes	?
Limine	Yes	Yes	No	No	Yes	Yes	Yes	Yes	No	Yes	Yes	Yes
loadlin	?	No	No	Yes	Yes	Yes	Yes	Yes	Yes	Yes	Yes	Yes
NTLDR	?	No	Yes	Yes	Yes	?	No	No	Yes	Yes	?	?
RedBoot	?	No	Yes	Yes	Yes	Yes	Yes	Yes	Yes	Yes	Yes	Yes
rEFInd	Yes	No	No	No	Yes	Yes	?	Yes	?	Yes	?	Yes
rEFIt (not maintained)	Yes	No	No	No	Yes	Yes	?	No	?	Yes	?	No
SPFdisk	?	Yes	Yes	Yes	Yes	Yes	?	?	Yes	?	?	?
SYSLINUX	No	Yes	Yes	Yes	Yes	Yes	Yes	Yes	Yes	Yes	Yes	Yes
systemd-boot / Gummiboot	Yes	No	No	No	Yes	Yes	Yes	?	?	Yes	?	?
Windows Boot Manager	Yes	No	Yes	No	Yes	Yes	?	Yes	Yes	Yes	Yes	?
wolfBoot	No	Yes	No	No	Yes	Yes	Yes	No	No	Yes	No	No
XOSL	?	No	No	Yes	Yes	Yes	Yes	Yes	?	No	?	No
Name	Can reside in				Can boot from							
Name	ESP (UEFI)	MBR	VBR	Floppy	Hard disk	Second Hard disk	Logical partitions	CD-ROM	Floppy	USB	Zip	LAN

=== Operating system support ===
Name	Can boot								
Name	MS-DOS	Windows 9x/Me	Windows NT series before Vista	Windows Vista/7/8/10	Linux	ReactOS	MenuetOS	*BSD	macOS
Acronis OS Selector	Yes	Yes	Yes	Yes	Yes	?	?	Yes	Yes
Barebox	?	?	?	?	Yes	?	?	?	?
BootKey	Yes	Yes	Yes	Yes	Yes	?	?	?	?
BootManager	Yes	Yes	Calls NTLDR	Calls Windows Boot Manager	Calls GRUB or LILO	?	?	?	?
BootX (Apple)	?	?	?	?	?	?	?	?	Yes
BootX (Linux)	?	?	?	?	Yes	?	?	?	?
Das U-Boot	?	?	?	?	Yes	?	?	Yes (FreeBSD)	?
GRUB Legacy and GRUB4DOS	Yes	Yes	Calls NTLDR	Calls Windows Boot Manager	Yes	Calls FreeLoader	Yes	Calls bootloader for some kernels	Yes
GNU GRUB	Yes	Yes	Calls NTLDR	Calls Windows Boot Manager	Yes	Calls FreeLoader	Yes	Yes	Yes
iBoot	?	?	?	?	?	?	?	?	Yes
LILO	?	Yes	Calls NTLDR	Yes	Yes	?	?	Calls biosboot (FreeBSD, PC-BSD, ...)	?
loadlin	with MEMDISK	No	No	No	Yes	No	No	?	?
Limine	Calls bootloader	Calls bootloader	Calls bootloader	Calls bootloader	Yes	Calls bootloader	Calls bootloader	Calls bootloader	Calls bootloader
NTLDR	Yes	Yes	Yes	No	Calls GRUB4DOS	?	?	?	Calls Darwin bootloader
RedBoot	Yes	Yes	Calls NTLDR	Calls Windows Boot Manager	Yes	Calls FreeLoader	Yes	Yes	Yes
rEFInd (fork of rEFIt)	?	?	Yes	Yes	Yes	?	?	Yes	Yes
rEFIt (not maintained)	?	?	Yes	Yes	Yes	?	?	Yes	Yes
SPFdisk	Yes	Yes	?	?	?	?	?	?	?
SYSLINUX	Yes	Yes	Calls NTLDR	Calls Windows Boot Manager	Yes	?	Yes	via mboot.c32 module	?
systemd-boot / Gummiboot	No	No	Windows Server 2013 64bits with UEFI only	Calls Windows Boot Manager	Yes	?	?	UEFI only	Yes
Windows Boot Manager	?	Yes	Calls NTLDR	Yes	Calls GRUB or LILO	?	?	?	?
wolfBoot	Yes	Yes	Yes	Yes	Yes	Yes	?	Yes	?
XOSL	Yes	Yes	Yes	Yes	Yes	?	?	?	?
Name	Can boot								
Name	MS-DOS	Windows 9x/Me	Windows NT series before Vista	Windows Vista/7/8/10	Linux	ReactOS	MenuetOS	*BSD	macOS

=== File-system support ===
==== Non-journaled ====
Name	FAT				Minix	ext2	HFS	AFFS	F2FS	YAFFS	
Name	FAT12	FAT16	FAT32	exFAT	Minix	ext2	HFS	AFFS	F2FS	YAFFS1	YAFFS2
Acronis OS Selector	?	?	?	?	?	?	?	?	?	?	?
Barebox	Yes	Yes	Yes	?	No	Yes	No	No	No	?	?
BootX (Apple)	?	?	?	?	?	?	?	?	?	?	?
BootX (Linux)	?	?	?	?	?	?	?	?	?	?	?
Das U-Boot	Yes	Yes	Yes	?	?	Yes	?	?	?	?	?
FreeLoader (ReactOS)	Yes	Yes	Yes	?	?	Yes	?	?	?	?	?
GNU GRUB 2	Yes	Yes	Yes	Yes	Yes	Yes	Yes	Yes	Yes	?	?
GRUB Legacy	Yes	Yes	Yes	No	Yes	Yes	No	No	No	?	?
Grub2Win	?	?	?	?	?	?	?	?	?	?	?
GRUB4DOS	Yes	Yes	Yes	No	Yes	Yes	No	No	No	?	?
iBoot	?	?	?	?	?	?	?	?	?	?	?
LILO	?	?	?	?	?	?	?	?	?	?	?
Limine	Yes	Yes	Yes	No	No	No	No	No	No	No	No
loader (FreeBSD)	Yes	Yes	Yes	?	?	Yes	?	?	?	?	?
loadlin	Yes	Yes	Yes	No	No	No	No	No	No	No	No
NTLDR	?	Yes	Yes	?	?	No	No	No	No	?	?
RedBoot	?	?	?	?	?	?	?	?	?	?	?
rEFInd	Yes (Note: https://wiki.archlinux.org/title/REFInd#Installing_the_rEFInd_Boot_Manager)			?	?	Yes (Note: rEFInd Features)	?	?	?	?	?
rEFIt	?	?	?	?	?	?	?	?	?	?	?
Syslinux	Yes	Yes	Yes	No	No	Yes	No	No	No	?	?
systemd-boot / Gummiboot	?	?	?	?	?	?	?	?	?	?	?
Windows Boot Manager	?	?	Yes	Yes	?	?	No	?	?	?	?
XOSL	?	?	?	?	?	?	?	?	?	?	?
yaboot	?	?	?	?	?	Yes	Yes	?	?	?	?

==== Journaled ====
Name	NTFS	ext3	ext4	ReiserFS	Reiser4	JFS	XFS	UFS	UDF	HFS+	BeFS	AFS	SFS	UBIFS	JFFS2
Acronis OS Selector	?	?	?	?	?	?	?	?	?	?	?	?	?	?	?
Barebox	?	Yes	Yes	?	?	?	?	?	?	?	?	?	?	Yes	Yes
BootManager	?	?	?	?	?	?	?	?	?	?	?	?	?	?	?
BootX (Apple)	?	?	?	?	?	?	?	?	?	?	?	?	?	?	?
BootX (Linux)	?	?	?	?	?	?	?	?	?	?	?	?	?	?	?
Das U-Boot	?	Yes	Yes	Yes	?	?	?	Yes	?	?	?	?	?	Yes	Yes
FreeLoader (ReactOS)	Yes	?	?	?	?	?	?	?	?	?	?	?	?	?	?
GNU GRUB 2	Yes	Yes	Yes	Yes	No	Yes	Yes	Yes	Yes	Yes	Yes	Yes	Yes	?	?
GRUB Legacy	No	Yes	patch (Note: Debian patch)	Yes (Note: GNU GRUB 0.97 manual)	No	Yes	Yes	Yes	No	No	No	No	No	No	No
Grub2Win	?	?	?	?	?	?	?	?	?	?	?	?	?	?	?
GRUB4DOS	Yes	Yes	Yes	Yes	No	Yes	Yes	Yes	?	?	?	?	?	?	?
iBoot	?	?	?	?	?	?	?	?	?	?	?	?	?	?	?
LILO	?	?	?	?	?	?	?	?	?	?	?	?	?	?	?
Limine	No	No	No	No	No	No	No	No	No	No	No	No	No	No	No
loader (FreeBSD)	?	?	?	?	?	?	?	?	?	?	?	?	?	?	?
loadlin	Yes (Note: Requires a TSR, such as NTFSDOS)	No	No	No	No	No	No	No	No	No	No	No	No	No	No
NTLDR	Yes	No	No	No	No	No	No	No	No	No	No	No	No	No	No
RedBoot	?	?	?	?	?	?	?	?	?	?	?	?	?	?	Yes
rEFInd	Partial (Note: rEFInd Features)	Yes	Yes	?	?	?	?	?	?	Yes	?	?	?	?	?
rEFIt	?	?	?	?	?	?	?	?	?	?	?	?	?	?	?
Syslinux	Yes	Yes	Partial (Note: https://wiki.syslinux.org/wiki/index.php?title=Filesystem#ext)	No	No	No	Yes	Yes	Yes	No	No	No	No	No	No
systemd-boot / Gummiboot	?	?	?	?	?	?	?	?	?	?	?	?	?	?	?
Windows Boot Manager	Yes	No	No	No	No	No	No	No	?	No	No	No	No	No	No
XOSL	?	?	?	?	?	?	?	?	?	?	?	?	?	?	?
yaboot	?	Yes	Yes	?	?	?	?	?	?	?	?	?	?	?	?

==== Copy-on-write ====
Name	btrfs	APFS	ZFS	NILFS	ReFS
Acronis OS Selector	?	?	?	?	No
Barebox	No	No	No	No	No
BootManager	?	?	?	?	No
BootX (Apple)	?	?	?	?	No
BootX (Linux)	?	?	?	?	No
Das U-Boot	?	?	Yes	?	No
FreeLoader (ReactOS)	Yes	?	?	?	No
GNU GRUB 2	Yes	No	Yes	Yes	No
GRUB Legacy	No	No	No	No	No
Grub2Win	?	?	?	?	No
GRUB4DOS	No	No	No	No	No
iBoot	?	?	?	?	No
LILO	?	?	?	?	No
Limine	No	No	No	No	No
loader (FreeBSD)	?	?	Yes	?	No
loadlin	No	No	No	No	No
NTLDR	No	No	No	No	No
RedBoot	?	?	?	?	No
rEFInd	Yes (Note: rEFInd Features)	?	?	?	No
rEFIt	?	?	?	?	No
Syslinux	Yes	No	No	No	No
systemd-boot / Gummiboot	?	?	?	?	No
Windows Boot Manager	?	No	?	?	No
XOSL	?	?	?	?	No
yaboot	?	?	?	?	No

==== Read-only ====
Name	cpio	tar	ISO 9660	romfs	SquashFS	cramfs
Acronis OS Selector	?	?	?	?	?	?
Barebox	?	?	?	?	Yes (Note: https://git.lumina-sensum.com/LuminaSensum/barebox/blob/master/Documentation/filesystems/squashfs.rst)	Yes
BootManager	?	?	?	?	?	?
BootX (Apple)	?	?	?	?	?	?
BootX (Linux)	?	?	?	?	?	?
Das U-Boot	?	?	?	?	Yes (Note: https://github.com/u-boot/u-boot/commit/c51006130370b48b7eb5a93ada745385aa27f6bf)	Yes
FreeLoader (ReactOS)	?	?	?	?	?	?
GNU GRUB 2	Yes	Yes	Yes	Yes	Yes	?
GRUB Legacy	?	?	Yes (Note: http://git.savannah.gnu.org/cgit/grub.git/tree/stage2/fsys_iso9660.c?h=grub-legacy)	?	?	?
Grub2Win	?	?	?	?	?	?
GRUB4DOS	?	?	Yes	?	?	?
iBoot	?	?	?	?	?	?
LILO	?	?	?	?	?	?
Limine	No	No	Yes	No	No	No
loader (FreeBSD)	?	?	?	?	?	?
loadlin	No	No	Yes (Note: Requires DOS support / TSR, such as MSCDEX)	?	?	?
NTLDR	?	?	?	?	?	?
RedBoot	?	?	?	?	?	?
rEFInd	?	?	Yes (Note: rEFInd Features)	?	?	?
rEFIt	?	?	?	?	?	?
Syslinux	?	?	Yes	?	?	?
systemd-boot / Gummiboot	?	?	?	?	?	?
Windows Boot Manager	No	No	Yes	No	No	No
XOSL	?	?	?	?	?	?
yaboot	?	?	?	?	?	?

=== Other features ===
Name	Advanced command	Scriptable	Supported architecture	Supported executable	Supported protocol	Supported decompression	Others
GRUB Legacy	Yes	No	x86 (PC)	Multiboot 1, Linux zImage, Linux bzImage and others	TFTP	gzip	
GRUB 2	Yes	Yes	x86 (PC, EFI, UEFI, coreboot, OLPC), IA-64, ARM (U-Boot, UEFI), PowerPC (OpenFirmware), MIPS, SPARC (OpenFirmware)	Multiboot and others	TFTP, HTTP	gzip, xz	
LILO	No	No	x86 (PC)	Linux zImage, Linux bzImage	?	bzip2, gzip	
loader (FreeBSD)	Yes	Yes	x86 (PC, EFI, UEFI, coreboot, OLPC), ARM (U-Boot, UEFI), MIPS, PowerPC (OpenFirmware), SPARC v9 (OpenFirmware)	FreeBSD ELF kernel image, Multiboot (incomplete, for Xen image only)	TFTP, NFS	gzip, bzip2	
kexec (Linux)	Depending on user space	Depending on user space	x86, ARM, ARM64, PowerPC, PowerPC 64, IA-64, IBM Z, RISC-V	Linux bzImage, Multiboot, other ELF image	Depending on configuration and user space	—N/a	The kexec system call can start another kernel, replacing the current running Linux, thus turning a Linux-based operating system into a fancy bootloader.
loadlin	No	No	x86 (PC)	Linux zImage, Linux bzImage	?	gzip	
SYSLINUX	via cmd.c32 module	via lua.c32 module	x86 (PC)	Linux zImage, Linux bzImage, Multiboot, MBR image	TFTP	gzip, bzip2, lzo, zip, lzma, ?	
Yaboot	No	No	PowerPC (Open Firmware)	Linux ELF image	TFTP	No	
RedBoot	Yes	yes (boot only)	ARM, ColdFire, H8300, x86, Freescale/Motorola 68000, MIPS, PowerPC, SH, SPARC, SPARCLite	ELF	TFTP, serial (X-modem)	gzip	
Das U-Boot	Yes	Yes	PowerPC, ARM, AVR32, Blackfin, ColdFire, IXP, Leon2, m68k, MicroBlaze, MIPS, NIOS, NIOS2, PXA, x86, RISC-V, StrongARM, SH2, SH3, SH4, ...	EFI, ELF, U-Boot image format, Linux zImage, raw	TFTP, NFS, serial (S-Record, Y-Modem, Kermit binary protocol)	bzip2, gzip, lzma	
Barebox	Yes	Yes	ARM, Blackfin, NIOS2, MIPS, x86, PowerPC	ELF, U-Boot image format	TFTP, NFS, serial (S-Record, Y-Modem, Kermit binary protocol)	bzip2, gzip, lz4, xz, lzo	
NTLDR	No	No	x86 (PC)	Windows NT kernel image (PE), MBR image	?	?	default bootloader on Windows NT
Windows Boot Manager	No	No	x86 (PC), ARM (only on Windows Mobile remake)	Portable Executable	?	?	Successor of NTLDR; used on Vista and up.
wolfBoot	?	?	ARM Cortex-M, ARM Cortex-R, ARM Cortex-A, Intel x86, RISC-V RV32, PowerPC, Renesas RH, TriCore	Raw binary, ELF, UEFI	TPM 2.0, PKCS#11. SPI, I²C, UART	Custom delta-update based on Bentley-Mcilroy compression algorithm	
FreeLoader (ReactOS)	No	No	x86 (PC), ARM, PowerPC	?	?	?	clone of NTLDR
Limine	Yes	No	x86 (PC, UEFI), ARM, RISC-V, LoongArch	Multiboot 1 and 2, Limine boot protocol, Linux zImage and bzImage	TFTP	gzip	
