= Limine (bootloader) =

Linux bootloader

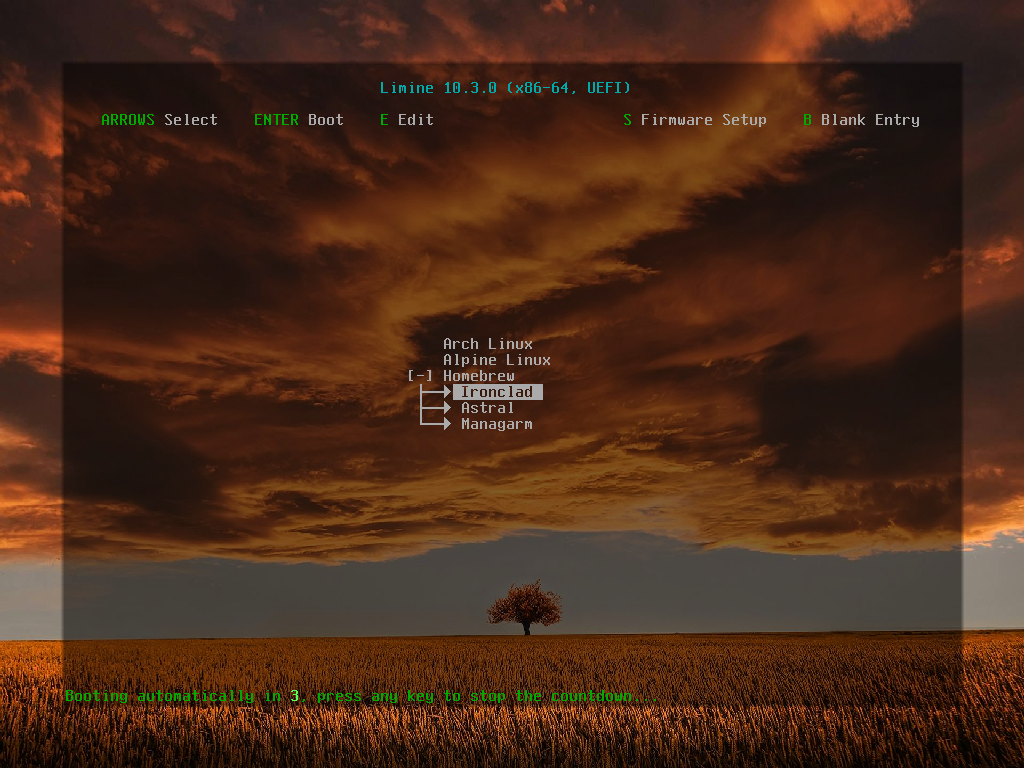
- Example Limine boot menu
- Developers: Mintsuki and contributors
- Stable release: 11.2.1 / 4 April 2026
- Written in: C, assembly languages
- Platform: ARM, RISC-V, loongArch, x86
- Type: Bootloader
- License: BSD-2-Clause
- Website: limine-bootloader.org
- Repository: github.com/Limine-Bootloader/Limine

Limine is a portable boot loader and the reference implementation for the Limine boot protocol. Multiboot2, chainloading, and the Linux boot protocols are also supported. Limine supports the ISO-9660 and FAT filesystems.

Limine aims to provide a more robust alternative to bootloaders like GNU GRUB, as well as its own boot protocol as an alternative to the Multiboot specification, with the goal of reducing the amount of work needed for a kernel developer to get a workable 64-bit environment once booted.

Limine is packaged by several Linux distributions, being offered by Arch Linux, where it is an option in archinstall, as well as included in EasyOS (a derivative of Puppy Linux), CachyOS,, Chimera Linux, and KaOS. Limine is also used by Cosmos and supported by SerenityOS.

== See also ==
- GNU GRUB
- BOOTMGR - current Windows bootloader
- rEFInd - alternative boot loader for UEFI-based computers
- Comparison of boot loaders
