= Boot Camp (software) =

Built-in macOS software to natively install Microsoft Windows on a Mac

Boot Camp Assistant

- Boot Camp running on macOS Monterey
- Developer: Apple
- Release: October 26, 2007; 18 years ago
- Final release: 6.1.19 (29 August 2022; 4 years ago)
- Type: Software assistant for dual booting
- License: Proprietary
- Website: support.apple.com/boot-camp

Boot Camp is a multi-boot feature supported by Apple for their macOS operating system to assist users in installing, managing, and booting into Microsoft Windows on Intel-based Macintosh computers. The Boot Camp Assistant utility guides users through non-destructive disk partitioning, including resizing of an existing HFS+ or APFS partition, if necessary, of their hard disk drive or solid-state drive and installation of Windows device drivers for the Apple hardware. Boot Camp Assistant also handles the installation of a Windows Control Panel applet to control the selection of the default boot operating system.

Initially an unsupported beta for Mac OS X 10.4 Tiger, Boot Camp was introduced with Mac OS X 10.5 Leopard and has been included in subsequent versions of the operating system. Previous versions of Boot Camp supported Windows XP and Windows Vista. Boot Camp 4.0 for Mac OS X 10.6 Snow Leopard version 10.6.6 up to Mac OS X 10.8 Mountain Lion version 10.8.2 supported only Windows 7. With the release of Boot Camp 5.0 for Mac OS X 10.8 Mountain Lion in version 10.8.3, only 64-bit versions of Windows 7 and Windows 8 are supported.

Boot Camp 6.0 added support for 64-bit versions of Windows 10. Boot Camp 6.1, available on macOS 10.12 Sierra and later, only accepts new installations of Windows 7 and later. This requirement was upgraded to requiring Windows 10 for macOS 10.14 Mojave.

Boot Camp is not supported on Apple silicon Macs, though it is possible to run ARM-based Windows 10 or Windows 11 via virtualization. As such, the application was removed in macOS 27 Golden Gate as that version of macOS only supports Apple silicon Macs.

== Overview ==
=== Installation ===
Installing Windows 10 on a Mac requires an ISO image of Windows 10 provided by Microsoft. Boot Camp combines Windows 10 with install scripts to load hardware drivers for the targeted Mac computer.

Boot Camp supports Windows 10 on Macs dated mid-2012 or newer. Apple silicon is not supported due to being ARM-based; although Windows 11 is able to run on ARM64, Microsoft only licenses Windows releases for ARM64 to original equipment manufacturers, and there are no drivers for the Apple silicon SoCs, so Windows cannot run on Apple silicon Macs natively.

=== Start-up Disk ===
A Mac boots from the last-used start-up disk. Holding down the option key (⌥) at startup brings up the boot manager which allows users to choose in which operating system to start the device. When using a non-Apple keyboard, the alt key performs the same action. The boot manager can also be launched by pressing the menu button on the Apple Remote at startup.

On older Macs, its functionality relies on BIOS emulation through EFI and a partition table information synchronization mechanism between GPT and MBR combined.

On newer Macs, Boot Camp keeps the hard disk as a GPT so that Windows is installed and booted in UEFI mode.

== Requirements ==
=== Mac OS X 10.7 Lion and OS X 10.8 Mountain Lion ===
Apple's Boot Camp system requirements lists the following requirements for Mac OS X Lion and OS X Mountain Lion:

- 8 GB USB storage device, or external drive formatted as MS-DOS (FAT) for installation of Windows drivers for Mac hardware
- 20 GB free hard disk space for a first-time installation or 40 GB for an upgrade from a previous version of Windows
- A full version of one of the following operating systems:
  - Windows 7 Home Premium, Professional, or Ultimate (64-bit editions only)
  - Windows 8 and Windows 8 Professional (64-bit editions only)
  - Windows 10 Home, Pro, Pro for Workstation, Education or Enterprise (64-bit editions only)

=== Mac OS X 10.5 Leopard and Mac OS X 10.6 Snow Leopard ===
Apple lists the following requirements for Mac OS X 10.5 Leopard and Mac OS X 10.6 Snow Leopard:

- An Intel-based Macintosh computer with the latest firmware. Early Intel-based Mac computers require an EFI firmware update for BIOS compatibility.
- A Mac OS X 10.5 Leopard or Mac OS X 10.6 Snow Leopard installation disc or Mac OS X Disc 1 included with Macs that have Mac OS X 10.5 Leopard or Mac OS X 10.6 Snow Leopard preinstalled. The disc is needed for installation of Windows drivers for Mac hardware.
- 10 GB free hard disk space (16 GB is recommended for Windows 7)
- A full version of one of the following operating systems:
  - Windows XP Home Edition or Windows XP Professional Edition with Service Pack 2 or higher (32-bit editions only)
  - Windows Vista Home Basic, Home Premium, Business, Enterprise or Ultimate (32-bit and 64-bit editions)
  - Windows 7 Home Premium, Professional, Enterprise or Ultimate (32-bit and 64-bit editions)

=== Supported Mac computers with Windows 8 ===
The earliest Macs that support Windows 8 are the mid-2011 MacBook Air, 13" mid-2011 or 15" and 17" mid-2010 MacBook Pro, except the mid-2010 13" computers, mid-2011 Mac Mini, 21" mid-2011 or 27" mid-2010 iMac, except the 21.5" mid-2010, and early 2009 Mac Pro.

== Limitations ==
- Boot Camp will only help a user partition their disk if the user has only a primary HFS+ or APFS partition, an EFI system partition, and a macOS Recovery partition.
- Boot Camp does not help users install Linux. Most methods for dual booting with Linux on Mac rely on manual disk partitioning, and the use of an EFI boot manager such as rEFInd.
- Macs transitioned to Thunderbolt 3 in 2016 and Boot Camp does not support running Windows with a Thunderbolt 3-powered External GPU (eGPU) unit under macOS High Sierra, macOS Mojave or macOS Catalina.

== Boot Camp version history ==
1.0 beta	April 5, 2006	Original release; Contained a software bug that prevented certain users from booting back into Mac OS X
1.1 beta	August 26, 2006	Support for the latest Intel-based Mac computers; Easier partitioning using presets for popular sizes; Ability to install Windows XP on any internal disk; Support for built-in iSight cameras; Support for built-in microphones; Right-click when pressing the right-hand Apple key on Apple keyboards; Improved Apple keyboard support including Delete, PrintScreen, NumLock, and ScrollLock keys
1.1.1 beta	September 14, 2006	Support for Core 2 Duo iMacs
1.1.2 beta	October 30, 2006	The Apple USB Modem works correctly; Trackpad scrolling and right-click gestures work correctly; Fixed idle sleep bugs; Reduced dialogs during Windows driver installation; Improved international support; Improved 802.11 wireless networking support
1.2 beta	March 28, 2007	Support for 32-bit Windows Vista; Updated drivers, including but not limited to trackpad, AppleTime (sync), audio, graphics, modem, iSight camera; Support for the Apple Remote to work with iTunes and Windows Media Player; A Windows Notification Area icon for easy access to Boot Camp information and actions; Improved keyboard support for Korean, Chinese, Swedish, Danish, Norwegian, Finnish, Russian, and French Canadian; Improved Windows driver installation experience; Updated documentation and Boot Camp online help in Windows; Apple Software Update for Windows XP and Vista
1.3 beta	June 7, 2007	Support for the MacBook Pro's backlit keyboard; Apple Remote pairing; Updated graphics drivers; Improved Boot Camp driver installer; Improved international keyboard support; Localization fixes; Updated Windows Help for Boot Camp
1.4 beta	August 8, 2007	Support for the MacBook Pro's backlit keyboard; Adds Apple Remote Pairing; Updated graphics drivers; Improved Boot Camp driver installer; Improved international keyboard support; Updates to Windows help for Boot Camp
2.0	October 26, 2007	Updated Boot Camp control panel; Updated keyboard support; Updated drivers; Updated localization; Support for the latest Mac models; Updates to Windows help for Boot Camp
2.1	April 24, 2008	Support for Windows XP with Service Pack 3; Support for 64-bit Windows Vista
2.2	November 19, 2009	Fixes issues with the trackpad and digital audio ports on portables; Adds support for Apple Magic Mouse and Wireless Keyboard
3.0	August 28, 2009	Read Mac Volumes from Windows; Read/Copy Files between Mac and Windows; Support for advanced features on Apple Cinema displays; Improved tap-to-click support; Command line version of the Startup Disk Control Panel from Windows
3.1	January 19, 2010	Support for Windows 7 (Home Premium, Professional, and Ultimate); Addresses issues with the Apple trackpad; Turns off the red digital audio port LED on laptop computers when it is not being used; Supports the Apple wireless keyboard and Apple Magic mouse
3.2	November 18, 2010	Adds support for the ATI Radeon HD 5870 graphics card, Apple USB Ethernet Adapter, MacBook Air SuperDrive; Addresses critical bug fixes; Drops support for 64-bit Windows Vista
3.3	August 24, 2011	Addresses critical bug fixes; Adds support for new hardware; Drops support for Windows XP, Windows Vista
4.0	July 20, 2012	Drops support for Windows XP and Vista; Available in Mac OS X 10.6 Snow Leopard, Mac OS X 10.7 Lion, and OS X 10.8 Mountain Lion; Added Support to Install ISO files from USB
5.0.5033	March 14, 2013	Support for Windows 8 and Windows 8 Pro (64-bit only); Boot Camp support for Macs with a 3 TB hard drive; Drops support for 32-bit Windows 7; Available only in OS X Mountain Lion version 10.8.3 and later
5.1	February 11, 2014	Support for Windows 8.1 and Windows 8.1 Pro (64-bit only)
6.0	August 13, 2015	Support for Windows 10 (64-bit only)
6.1	September 20, 2016	Only accept new installations of Windows 7, Windows 8.1 and Windows 10 (64-bit only)
6.1.13	October 26, 2020	Improves audio recording quality when using the built-in microphone; Fixes a stability issue that could occur during heavy CPU load on 16" MacBook Pro (2019 and 2020) and 13" MacBook Pro (2020)
6.1.14	May 17, 2021	Additional security updates
6.1.15	June 10, 2021	Adds the Precision Touchpad driver for devices with Apple T2 chips
6.1.17	March 19, 2022	Added support for the Studio Display and updates drivers for AMD and Intel GPUs
6.1.16	August 22, 2022	Adds WiFi WPA3 support; Fixes a Bluetooth driver issue that could occur when resuming from Sleep or Hibernation modes
6.1.19	August 29, 2022	Additional updates to the Precision Touchpad driver; Addresses other bug fixes

== Boot Camp support software (for Windows) version history ==
Version	Date	Supported Systems
5.1.5621	Feb 11, 2014	MacBook Air (11-inch & 13-inch, Mid 2011); MacBook Air (11-inch & 13-inch, Mid 2012); MacBook Pro (15-inch & 17-inch, Mid 2010); MacBook Pro (13-inch, & 15-inch, Early 2011); MacBook Pro (17-inch, Early 2011); MacBook Pro (13-inch,15-inch & 17-inch Late 2011); MacBook Pro (13-inch & 15-inch, Mid 2012); MacBook Pro (Retina, Mid 2012); MacBook Pro (Retina, 13-inch, Late 2012); MacBook Pro (Retina, 13-inch & 15-inch Early 2013); Mac Pro (Early 2009); Mac Pro (Mid 2010); Mac Pro (Mid 2012); Mac mini (Mid 2011); Mac mini (Late 2012); iMac (27-inch, Mid 2010); iMac (21.5-inch & 27-inch, Mid 2011); iMac (21.5-inch, Late 2011); iMac (21.5-inch & 27-inch, Late 2012); iMac (21.5-inch) Early 2013
5.1.5640	Feb 11, 2014	MacBook Air (11-inch, Mid 2013); MacBook Air (13-inch, Mid 2013); MacBook Air (11-inch, Early 2014); MacBook Air (13-inch, Early 2014); MacBook Pro (Retina, 13-inch, Late 2013); MacBook Pro (Retina, 15-inch, Late 2013); MacBook Pro (Retina, 13-inch, Mid 2014); MacBook Pro (Retina, 15-inch, Mid 2014); Mac Pro (Late 2013); iMac (21.5-inch, Late 2013); iMac (27-inch, Late 2013)
5.1.5722	Aug 12, 2015	iMac (21.5-inch, Mid 2014)
5.1.5769	Aug 12, 2015	iMac (Retina 5K, 27-inch, Late 2014); Mac Mini (Late 2014)
6.1.6655	Sep 25, 2017	MacBook Pro (Retina, 15 inch, 2015); MacBook Pro (Retina, 13 inch, early 2015); MacBook Pro (Retina, 15 inch, mid 2014); MacBook Pro (Retina, 13 inch, mid 2014); MacBook Pro (Retina, 15 inch, Late 2013); MacBook Pro (Retina, 13 inch, Late 2013); MacBook Pro (Retina, 15 inch, early 2013); MacBook Pro (Retina, 13 inch, early 2013); MacBook Pro (Retina, 13 inch, Late 2012); MacBook Pro (Retina, mid 2012); MacBook Pro (13 inch, mid 2012); MacBook Pro (15 inch, mid 2012); MacBook Air (13 inch, early 2015); MacBook Air (11 inch, early 2015); MacBook Air (13 inch, early 2014); MacBook Air (11 inch, early 2014); MacBook Air (13 inch, 2013); MacBook Air (11 inch, 2013); MacBook Air (13 inch, mid 2012); MacBook Air (11 inch, mid 2012); MacBook (Retina display, 12 inch, early 2015); iMac (Retina 5K display, 27 inch, 2015); iMac (Retina 5K display, 27 inch, Late 2014); iMac (21.5 inch, mid 2014); iMac (27 inch, Late 2013); iMac (21.5 inch, Late 2013); iMac (27 inch, Late 2012); iMac (21.5 inch, Late 2012); Mac mini (Late 2014); Mac mini Server (late 2012); Mac mini (late 2012); Mac Pro (late 2013)
6.1.6700	Unknown	MacBook Pro (Retina, 15 inch, 2017)
6.1.6851	Apr 19, 2018	MacBook Pro (Retina, 15 inch, 2017)
6.1.7748	Dec 09, 2019	MacBook Pro (Retina, 16 inch, 2019)
6.1.7800	Unknown	MacBook Pro (Retina, 16 inch, 2019)
6.1.8034	Dec 16, 2021	MacBook Pro (Retina, 16 inch, 2019)

== See also ==
- Parallels Desktop for Mac
- rEFIt and rEFInd
- VMware Fusion
- VirtualBox
