= BootX =

BootX may refer to:

- BootX (Apple), the default Apple bootloader.
- BootX (Linux), the free Linux bootloader for Macintosh computers.
