= RedBoot =

- Operating system: eCos
- Type: Bootstrapping
- License: eCos License: GPL-2.0-or-later (with linking exception)
- Website: ecos.sourceware.org/redboot/

RedBoot (an acronym for Red Hat Embedded Debug and Bootstrap firmware) is an open-source application that uses the eCos real-time operating system Hardware Abstraction Layer to provide bootstrap firmware for embedded systems.

RedBoot allows download and execution of embedded applications via serial or Ethernet, including embedded Linux and eCos applications. It provides debug support in conjunction with GDB to allow development and debugging of embedded applications. It also provides an interactive command line interface to allow management of the Flash images, image download, RedBoot configuration, etc., accessible via serial or Ethernet. For unattended or automated startup, boot scripts can be stored in Flash allowing, for example, loading of images from Flash, hard disk, or a TFTP server.

== See also ==
- Comparison of boot loaders
- Das U-Boot
- Coreboot
