= KaOS =

KDE-focused Linux distribution

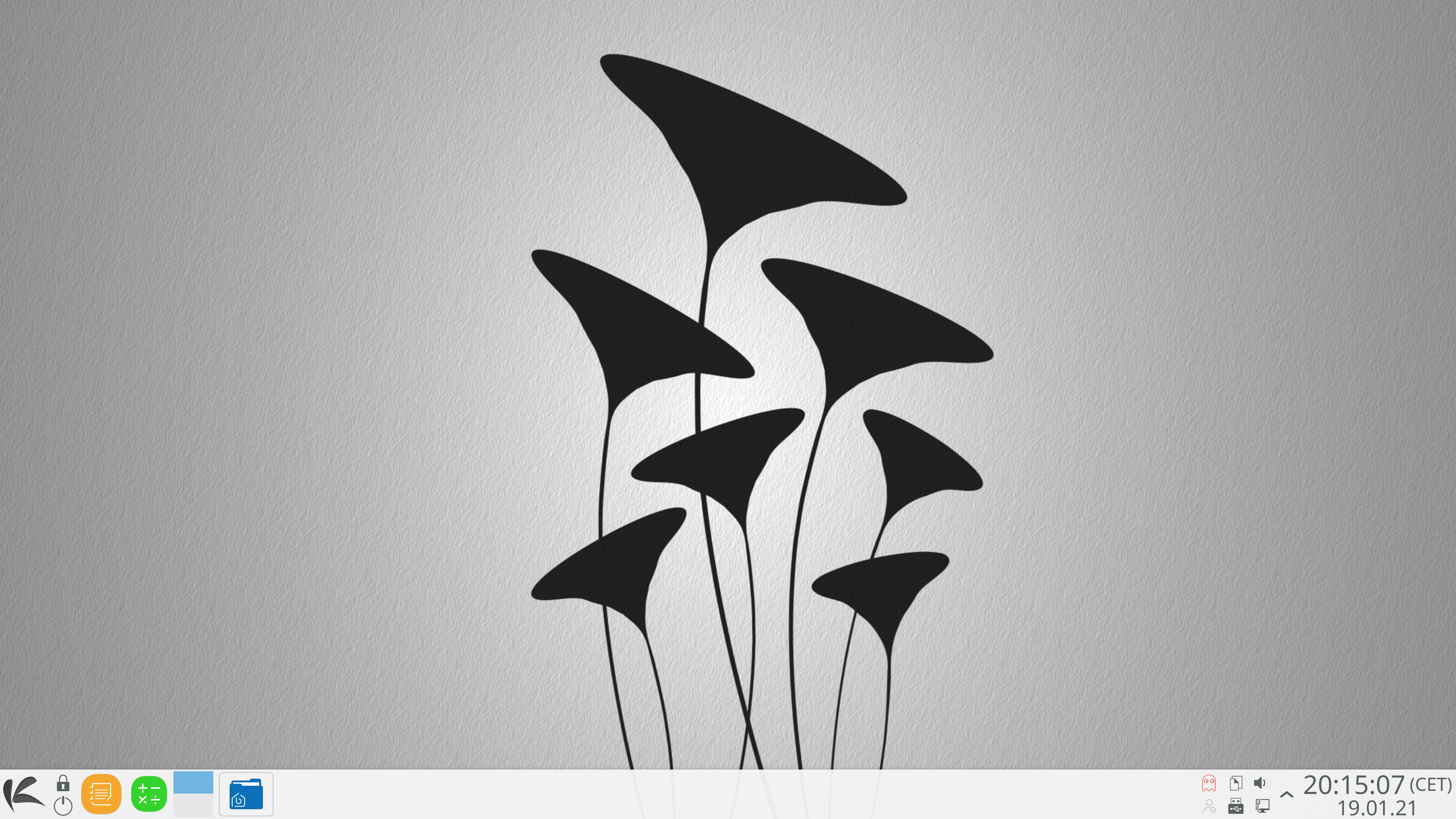
- KaOS 2021.01, with "Midna" theme
- Written in: C, C++, Rust and others
- OS family: Linux
- Working state: Current
- Source model: Open source
- Initial release: 2013.11 / November 10, 2013; 12 years ago
- Latest release: 2026.06 / June 24, 2026; 4 months ago
- Repository: codeberg.org/KaOS
- Available in: 35 languages (as of Feb. 2026)
- List of languages
- Update method: Rolling release
- Package manager: pacman
- Instruction sets: x86-64
- Kernel type: Linux (monolithic)
- Userland: GNU Core
- Influenced by: Arch Linux
- Default user interface: Niri/Noctalia (graphical)
- Official website: kaosx.us
- Tagline: "A Lean KDE Distribution"

KaOS is an independent Linux distribution based on Qt software development toolkit. It includes Calligra and other KDE Applications.

== History ==
Initial prerelease development work on the project took place under the provisional codename "KdeOS" from May to August 2013. To prevent confusion between the distribution's name and the KDE desktop environment, the name was changed to "KaOS" in September 2013.

In February 2026, KaOS 2026.02 was released, dropping its previous KDE Plasma desktop after 12 years for a Niri/Noctalia setup, to avoid using Systemd. The KaOS developers adopted Limine as the default bootloader and intend to use Dinit as the default init system.

== Features ==
KaOS is distributed via an optical disc image, and exclusively supports 64-bit x86 processors.

KaOS follows a rolling release model, built from scratch with a specific focus on one software framework (Qt) and one architecture (x86-64), with an emphasis on evaluating and selecting the most suitable tools and applications.

=== Applications ===
The default applications include:

- Ark (archive file handler)
- Calamares (guided installation wizard)
- Croeso (appearance and package controller)
- Dolphin (file manager)
- Elisa (audio player)
- Falkon (web browser)
- Gwenview (image viewer)
- Haruna (video player)
- K3b (optical disc authoring)
- Kamoso (webcam management)
- Kate (text editor)
- KDE Partition Manager
- Konsole (terminal emulator)
- KWrite (simple text editor)
- LibreOffice (productivity suite)
- mpv (media player)
- Octopi (graphical package manager)
- Okular (document viewer)
- Quassel IRC (chat client)
- SimpleScreenRecorder (screencast capture utility)
- Spectacle (screenshot utility)
- Vim (text editor)

== Reception ==
Hectic Geek reviewed KaOS in 2014, and wrote that the distribution was not very fast, but included all necessary applications.

Jesse Smith from DistroWatch Weekly wrote a review of KaOS 2014.04. Smith said the features of KaOS worked well.

ZDNET wrote a hands-on review about KaOS 2014.06:

KaOS doesn't intend to be, or claim to be, a general-purpose Linux distribution for everyone, or a dead-easy distribution for complete newcomers to Linux. But if you are interested in a solid, carefully focused KDE-specific distribution for 64-bit systems, then I think KaOS could be a very interesting choice.

— Jamie A. Watson, ZDNET (2014)

Dedoimedo reviewed KaOS 2014.12:

KaOS 2014.12 is a very slick, very beautiful product. But it is not the most refined operating system out there. Sure, in terms of friendliness and accessibility, it's right there among the big names, offering everything a user might want or need. Still, to get to that point, you will need to sweat a little. Printing, installer errors, availability of software, all these are potentially critical obstacles that must be addressed before KaOS can become a familiar and well-recommended family name.

— Igor Ljubuncic, Dedoimedo (2015)

Linux journalist Michael Larabel, who owns/operates the Phoronix.com tech news wen site, had this to say in 2016,

Overall, I was quite pleased with it for being a niche distribution. KaOS was easy to install and was quickly running on a bleeding-edge KDE Plasma 5 stack. Overall, it was a fun and pleasant few hours spent with KaOS.

— Michael Laravel, Phoronix.com (2016)

Jack Wallen from Linux.com stated his opinion about KaOS in 2016, and said that the distribution is beautiful.

GeeksMint stated in 2017, that KaOS "is a modern, open-source, beautifully designed, QT and KDE-focused Linux distro. It is a rolling release that ships with KDE Plasma as its default Desktop Environment, uses Pacman as its package manager, and has a 3-group structure repository on GitHub." and "The fact that it is a rolling release means that you will never need to worry about future updates the moment you have a version installed like in the case of Ubuntu and the like where you would need to consider whether to perform a clean installation of another “major version” or not."

Robert Rijkhoff reviewed KaOS 2017.09 for DistroWatch Weekly, and he said that "KaOS seems to be trying a little bit hard to be different".
