= Barebox =

Bootloader for embedded devices

- Original authors: Sascha Hauer, the barebox community
- Release: 24 December 2009; 16 years ago
- Stable release: Monthly release schedule
- Written in: C, Assembly language
- Platform: ARM, x86, MIPS, RISC-V, PowerPC, OpenRISC, Kalray MPPA
- Available in: English
- Type: Firmware, Bootloader
- License: GPL-2.0-only
- Website: www.barebox.org
- Repository: git.pengutronix.de/cgit/barebox/

Barebox is a primary boot loader used in embedded devices. It is free software under the GPL-2.0-only license. It is available for a number of different computer architectures, including ARM, x86, MIPS and RISC-V.

== History ==
The Barebox project began in July 2007 as u-boot-v2, as it was derived from Das U-Boot, but with heavier borrowings from Linux like similar utilities and with a more Linux-like coding style.

== See also ==
- Comparison of boot loaders
