= BootX (Apple) =

Boot loader developed by Apple

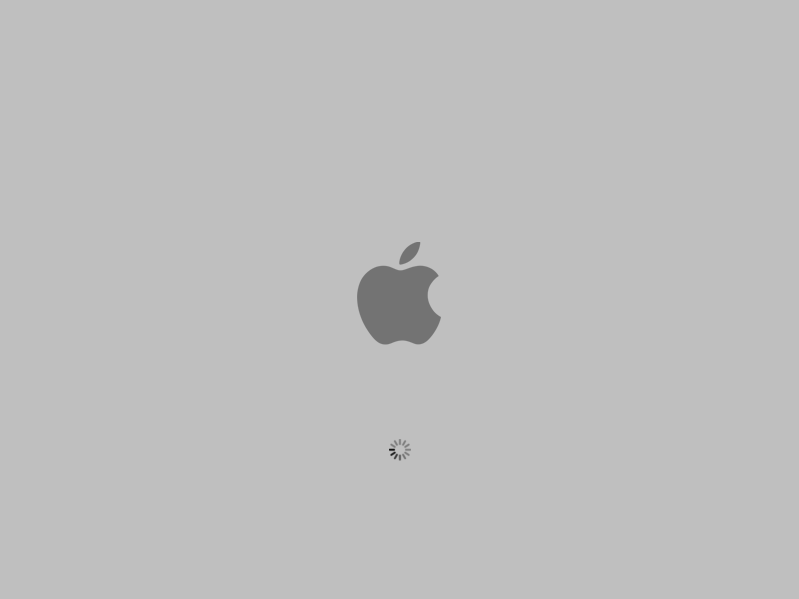
- The BootX booting screen used on Macintoshes with Mac OS X 10.2 or later
- Developer: Apple Inc.
- Release: March 24, 2001 (with Mac OS X 10.0)
- Operating system: Darwin & Mac OS X
- Platform: PowerPC
- Type: Boot loader
- License: Apple Public Source License

BootX is a software-based bootloader designed and developed by Apple Inc. for use on the company's Macintosh (now Mac) computer range. BootX is used to prepare the computer for use, by loading all required device drivers and then starting-up Mac OS X by booting the kernel on all PowerPC Macs running Mac OS X.

The Intel-based Macs introduced in 2006 have a Unified Extensible Firmware Interface (UEFI) ROM, and use a UEFI-based bootloader named boot.efi rather than BootX.

The program is freely available as part of the Darwin operating system under the open-source Apple Public Source License.

== History ==
Old World boot icon

Older Macintoshes dating from 1983 until 1998 utilize a basic bootloader. Those Macintoshes include a ROM chip varying in sizes up to 4 megabytes (MB), which contains both the computer code to boot the computer and the Macintosh Toolbox operating system code.

New World boot icon

In 1998, with the advent of the first iMac, the firmware was updated. The ROM was reduced in size to 1 MB and was called BootROM, and the remainder of the ROM was moved to the file Mac OS ROM in the Mac OS System Folder, stored on the hard drive. This ROM used a full implementation of the Open Firmware standard (contained in BootROM) and was named New World ROM; while the boot-ROM part of the previous ROM was retroactively named Old World ROM.

Old Mac OS X boot icon (10.1)

In 2001, with the release of Mac OS X 10.0, the Mac OS ROM file was replaced with the BootX bootloader file. In 2002, with the release of Mac OS X 10.2, the historical "Happy Mac" start-up picture used since the first version of Classic Mac OS was replaced with a grey Apple logo.

In 2006, with the introduction of Macs using Intel-based hardware, BootROM was replaced by the Unified Extensible Firmware Interface (UEFI) ROM (although Apple still calls it BootROM) and BootX is replaced by the boot.efi file.

== Features ==
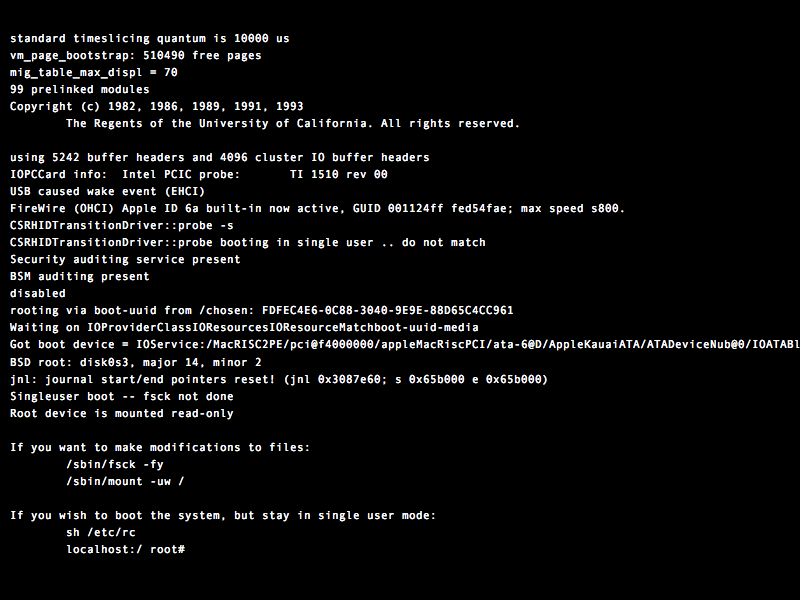
Mac OS X booting up in single-user mode

To make the boot loader appealing to other operating system developers, Apple added features to allow flexibility in the booting process such as network boot using TFTP and load Mach-O and ELF formatted kernels. BootX can also boot from HFS, HFS+, UFS and ext2 formatted volumes. The boot loader can be manipulated at startup by holding down various key combinations to alter the booting process. Such functions include Verbose Mode, achieved by holding down the Command and V key at startup, which replaces the default Apple logo with text-based information on the boot process and Single User Mode, achieved by holding down the Command and S, which, depending on the operating system, may boot into a more basic command-line or text-based version of the operating system, to facilitate maintenance and recovery action. The ROM can also be set to require a password to access these technical functions using the OpenFirmware interface.

== Boot process ==
In PowerPC-based Macintoshes, the boot process starts with the activation of BootROM, the basic Macintosh ROM, which performs a Power On Self Test to test hardware essential to startup. On the passing of this test, the startup chime is played and control of the computer is passed to OpenFirmware. OpenFirmware initializes the Random Access Memory, Memory Management Unit and hardware necessary for the ROM's operation. The OpenFirmware then checks settings, stored in NVRAM, and builds a list of all devices on a device tree by gathering their stored FCode information.

On the completion of this task, BootX takes over the startup process configuring the keyboard and display, claiming and reserving memory for various purposes and checking to see if various key combinations are being pressed. After this process has been completed BootX displays the grey Apple logo, spins the spinning wait cursor, and proceeds to load the kernel and some kernel extensions and start the kernel.

== See also ==
- Comparison of bootloaders
