= XOSL =

Boot loader

xOSL (meaning Extended Operating System Loader) is a bootloader. xOSL was originally developed by Geurt Vos.

Additional layout design by Dan Duskin, and graphical logo by Mark Monciardini.

== History ==
xOSL is free software released under the GPL-2.0-only license. The project was actively developed by Geurt Vos between 1999 and 2001 and spanned four major revisions and two minor revisions after its initial creation.

From its origin in xOSL version 1.0.0, xOSL underwent major changes in ver. 1.1.0, 1.1.1, 1.1.2 and 1.1.3. These revisions were significant departures from one another, and introduced new features to the program. These features ranged from drastic user interface improvements to improved compatibility on diverse hardware platforms.

xOSL ver. 1.1.4 and 1.1.5 only introduced improvements to existing functionality and repaired features that should have been functional in their predecessors. Although their improvements were subtle, they did serve to stabilize a developing protocol, and are the most polished revisions of the original to date.

The project lapsed into a dormant state and was abandoned by its original developer from 2001 to 2007. xOSL remained available for download and use throughout this period.

== Survivability ==
Despite the lack of active product development, an enthusiastic community of xOSL users began exchanging ideas and product results through the use of Yahoo! Groups and other support sites on the internet. These groups became the foundation of the 'xOSL Culture'. The xOSL groups assisted fellow members with advice and accomplishments through the use of xOSL. After the original xOSL web site expired it was mirrored in multiple locations by Filip Komar and Mikhail Ranish.

Very few enhancements to the original product occurred during this time, most of them being fairly inconsequential. One such enhancement gave the user the ability to change wallpapers and the image displayed at startup, and like most other revisions, it did not add a great deal to the program in terms of core functionality.

Other revisions included the translation of xOSL into several different languages, including German, Czech and French, among others.

== XOSL-OW ==
XOSL-OW is an Open Watcom Port of XOSL. XOSL is developed by Geurt Vos using the Borland C++ 3.1 tool set while XOSL-OW is based on the Open Watcom version 1.8 tool set. The XOSL-OW Open Watcom Port allows for future development of XOSL using an Open Source development tool set.

XOSL-OW has no new functionality compared to XOSL but it does give improved behavior on specific PC hardware. In fact stability issues with XOSL on some PC platforms have been the reason for porting XOSL to the Open Watcom tool set.

Examples of stability issues on specific PC hardware are:

- Launching the Ranish Partition Manager from within the XOSL boot manager (Ctrl-P) results in a non-responsive keyboard.
- Booting into the Smart Boot Manager (used to support booting from CD/DVD) results in a non-responsive keyboard.
- Booting into Linux using the XOSL boot manager is not successful because of a non-responsive keyboard after the XOSL boot manager hands over control to the Linux boot process.

In XOSL-OW these stability issues have been solved by an improved A20 line switching algorithm and flushing the keyboard buffer before the XOSL boot manager hands over control to either the Ranish Partition manager, the Smart Boot Manager or the Operating System Bootloader.

== Compatible file-systems ==
Currently xOSL is capable of booting operating systems from a variety of format types. These include, and may not be limited to:

- Windows
  - FAT12 (File Allocation Table)
  - FAT16
  - FAT32
  - NTFS (New Technology File System)
- Linux
  - ext2
  - ext3
  - ReiserFS
