= REFIt =

rEFIt
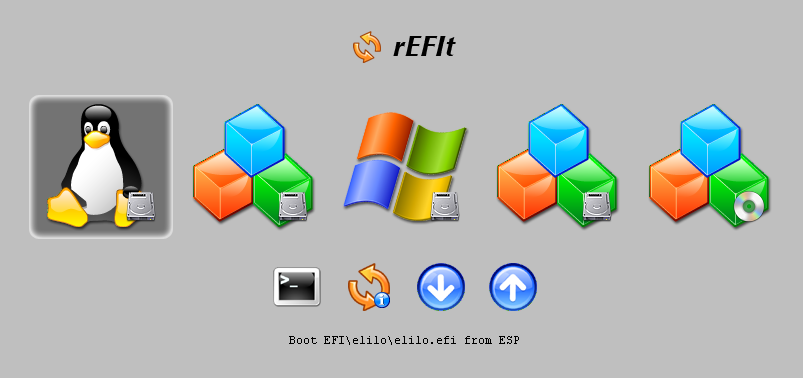
- Developer: Christoph Pfisterer
- Initial release: 0.1 / 2 March 2006; 19 years ago
- Stable release: 0.14 / 7 March 2010; 15 years ago
- Repository: sf.net/p/refit/code/
- Written in: C
- Operating system: Linux, Windows (for burning a bootable CD), Mac OS X (for primary use)
- Type: Boot menu
- License: GPL-2.0-or-later, BSD-3-Clause, additional components released under various licenses
- Website: refit.sf.net

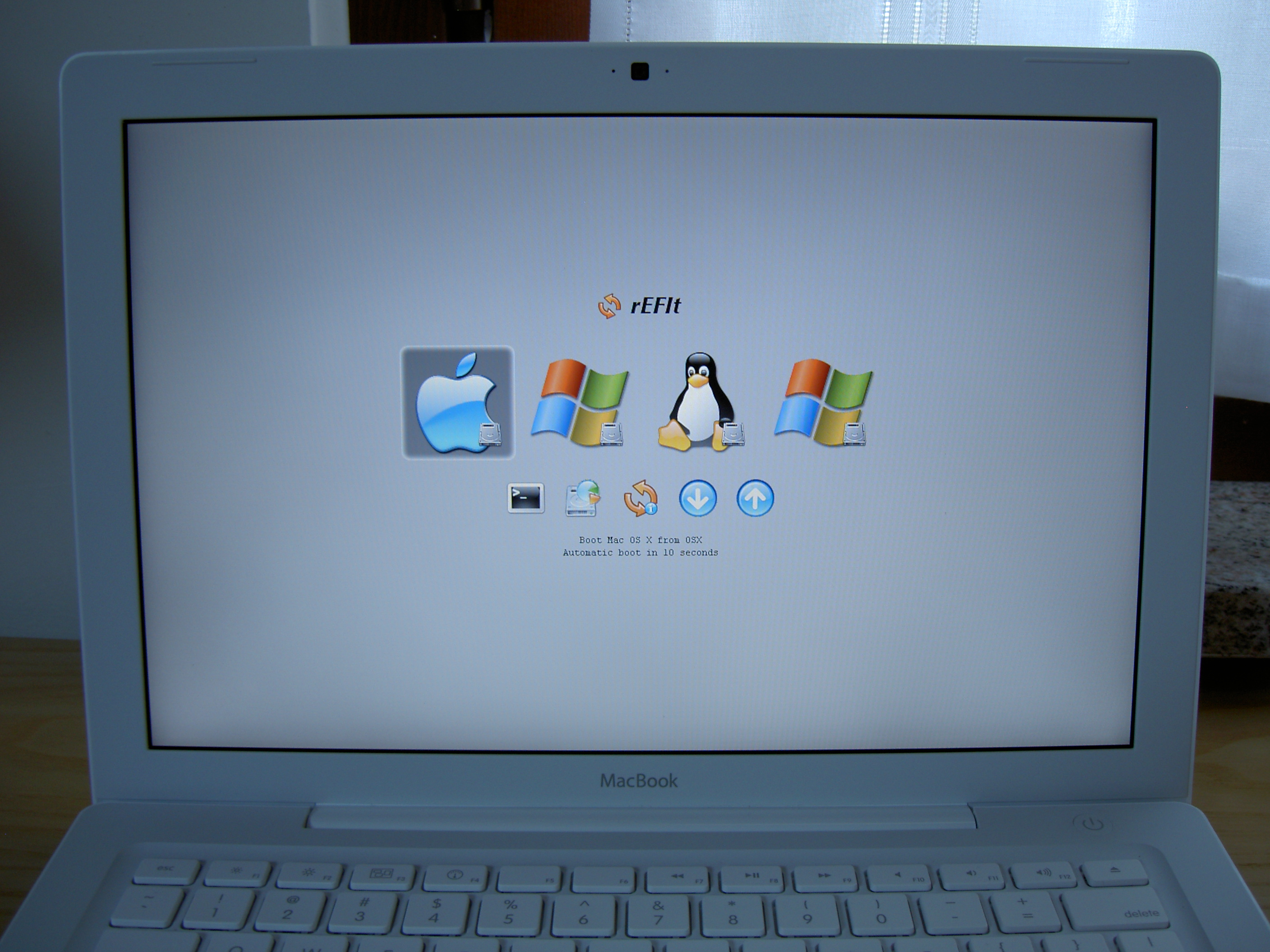
rEFIt on a MacBook

rEFIt is a boot menu and maintenance toolkit for EFI-based machines like the Intel Macs. It can be used to boot multiple operating systems, including triple-boot setups with software such as Apple's Boot Camp Assistant. It also provides a way to enter and explore the EFI pre-boot environment. The name "rEFIt" is likely a play on the terms "refit" and "EFI".

Development on "rEFIt" was abandoned by Christoph Pfisterer in 2010. However, in 2012 the developer Roderick W. Smith forked it as a new project called rEFInd.
