= Loadlin =

Linux boot loader

loadlin
- Developers: Hans Lermen, Samuel Thibault
- Initial release: 1994
- Stable release: 1.6f / September 17, 2012; 13 years ago
- Operating system: DOS
- Type: Bootloader
- License: GPL-2.0-or-later
- Website: Official website

loadlin is a Linux boot loader that runs under 16-bit real-mode DOS (including the MS-DOS mode of Windows 95, Windows 98 and Windows Me startup disk). It allows the Linux system to load and replace the running DOS without altering existing DOS system files.

loadlin and the Linux kernel are both files on a file system accessible to DOS. It loads the Linux kernel into memory from a file. It also places various configuration parameters into memory, and transfers control to the kernel. The kernel reads these parameters, initializes and runs, replacing DOS completely.

Optionally, it can be configured to supply the kernel with an initial RAM disk, loaded into memory before transferring control to the Linux kernel. It passes to the kernel information about the RAM disk and its location. Furthermore, parameters can be passed to the Linux kernel that make it use that RAM disk as its root file system. The startup programs in that file system often cause Linux to mount another file system (perhaps on a fixed disk) and switch to using that as its root file system.

loadlin operates as a separate program and does not modify the master boot record, which can be useful for situations where there are concerns about modifying the MBR (which could lead to an unbootable system if done incorrectly). Due to its structure, loadlin only works on DOS-based operating systems, and will not work on NT-based versions of Windows.

== See also ==
- GNU GRUB
- LILO (bootloader)
- GAG (Gestor de Arranque Gráfico)
- SYSLINUX
- WinKExec
- Win32-loader (Debian)
