= Systemd-boot =

UEFI boot manager

systemd-boot
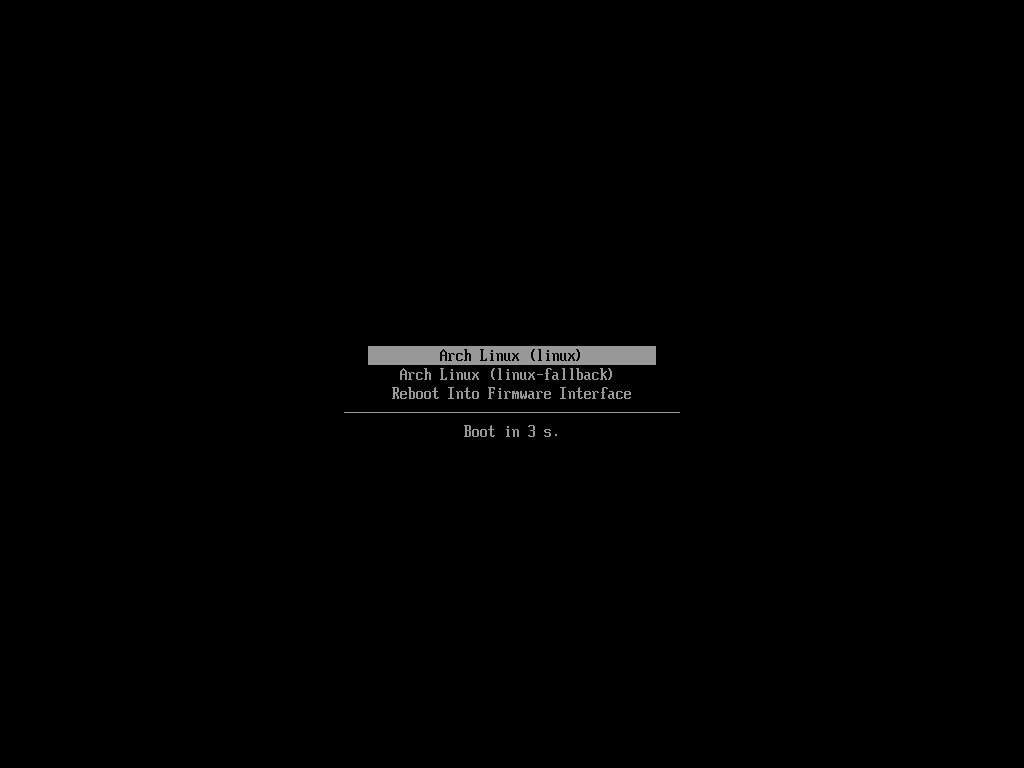
- Developers: Kay Sievers, Harald Hoyer, Karel Zak
- Initial release: June 28, 2012; 13 years ago
- Repository: github.com/systemd/systemd/tree/main/src/boot
- Written in: C
- Type: Boot loader for UEFI systems
- License: LGPL-2.1-or-later
- Website: systemd.io/BOOT/

systemd-boot is a free and open-source boot manager, previously known as gummiboot.

== gummiboot ==
gummiboot was developed by the Red Hat employees Kay Sievers and Harald Hoyer and designed as a minimal alternative to GNU GRUB for systems using the Unified Extensible Firmware Interface (UEFI). The boot loader automatically detected bootable images (including operating systems and other boot loaders), did not require a configuration file, provided a basic menu-based interface, and could also integrate with systemd to provide performance data.

As a word play, the name "gummiboot" means "rubber (inflatable) boat" in German, the native language of its initial developers. Despite being developed by two of its employees, Red Hat's Fedora Project did not use gummiboot for booting UEFI systems; instead, it used efilinux to chainload GRUB.

gummiboot was licensed under LGPL-2.1-or-later, unlike GRUB which is licensed under the GPL-3.0-or-later. This distinction was intended to allow gummiboot to be suitable for use on UEFI systems implementing secure boot, due to concerns surrounding its requirement to distribute all authorization keys (digital certificates) needed to run GPL-v3-licensed software if hardware restrictions such as secure boot are in effect.

In May 2015, gummiboot was merged into systemd and renamed to "systemd-boot".

== See also ==
- Comparison of boot loaders
