= REFInd =

Boot manager for UEFI systems

rEFInd

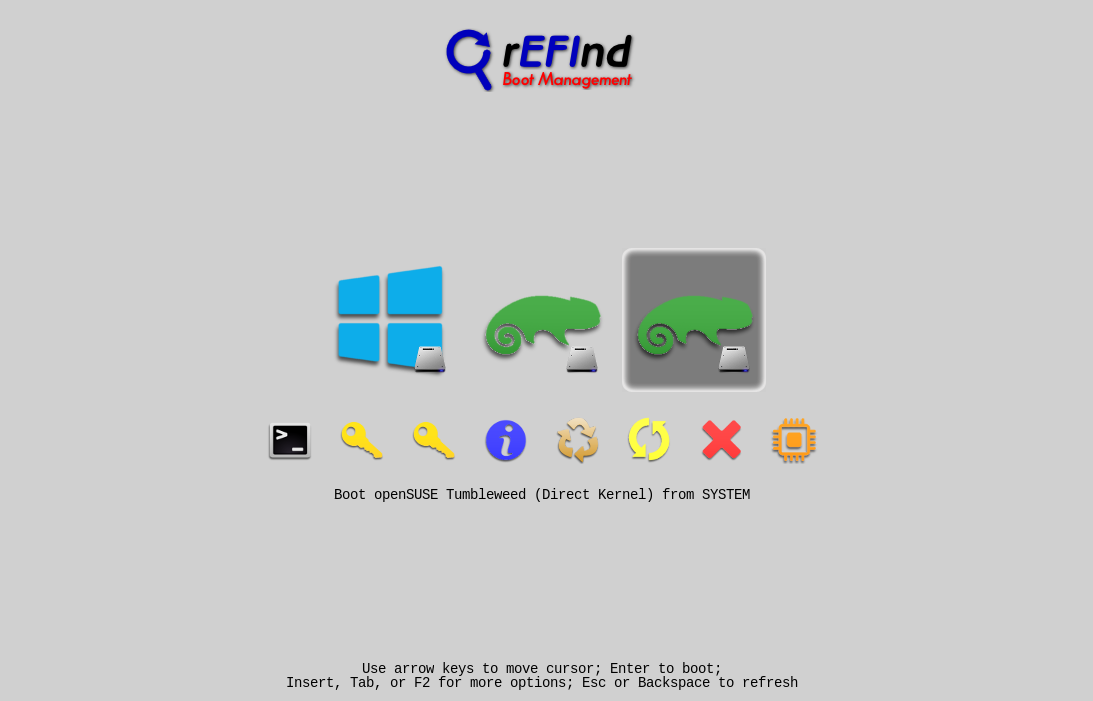
- rEFInd with default theme showing boot selections of Windows 11 and openSUSE Tumbleweed (with both GNU GRUB and kernel EFI stub loader)
- Developer: Roderick W. Smith
- Release: 14 March 2012
- Stable release: 0.14.2 / 6 April 2024; 2 years ago
- Written in: C
- Operating system: Linux, macOS, Microsoft Windows, TrueOS
- Platform: IA-32, x86-64, AArch64
- Size: ~ 4 MiB
- Available in: English
- Type: UEFI boot manager
- License: GPL-3.0-or-later, BSD-3-Clause (original program), additional components released under various licenses
- Website: www.rodsbooks.com/refind
- Repository: sf.net/p/refind/code/

rEFInd is a boot manager for UEFI and EFI-based machines. It can be used to boot multiple operating systems that are installed on a single non-volatile device. It also provides a way to launch UEFI applications.

It was forked from discontinued rEFIt in 2012, with 0.2.0 as its first release.

rEFInd supports the IA-32, x86-64, and AArch64 architectures.

== Features ==
rEFInd has several features:

- Automatic operating systems detection.
- Customisable OS launch options.
- Graphical or text mode. Theme is customisable.
- Mac-specific features, including spoofing booting process to enable secondary video chipsets on some Macs.
- Linux-specific features, including autodetecting EFI stub loader to boot Linux kernel directly and using fstab in lieu of rEFInd configuration file for boot order.
- Support for Secure Boot.

== Adoption ==
rEFInd is the default UEFI boot manager for TrueOS.

rEFInd is included in official repositories of major Linux distributions, such as Arch Linux, Debian, Ubuntu, and Gentoo.

== Development ==
GNU-EFI and TianoCore are supported as main development platforms for writing binary UEFI applications in C to launch right from the rEFInd GUI menu. Typical purposes of an EFI application are fixing boot problems and programmatically modifying settings within UEFI environment, which would otherwise be performed from within the BIOS of a personal computer (PC) without UEFI.

rEFInd can be built with either GNU-EFI or TianoCore EDK2/UDK.

== Fork ==
RefindPlus is a fork of rEFInd that adds several features and improvements for Mac devices, specifically MacPro3,1 and MacPro5,1, and equivalent Xserve.

== See also ==
- GNU GRUB – another boot loader for Unix-like systems
- Comparison of boot loaders
- efibootmgr manipulates the EFI boot manager: create and destroy boot entries, change the boot order and other
