= LILO (bootloader) =

Boot loader

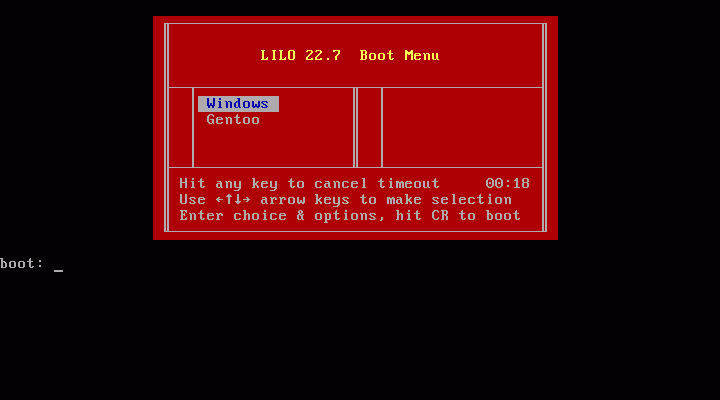
- Standard LILO menu
- Developers: Werner Almesberger (1992–1998), John Coffman (1999–2007), Joachim Wiedorn (2010–2015)
- Initial release: June 29, 1992; 33 years ago
- Final release: 24.2 / November 22, 2015; 10 years ago
- Type: Bootloader
- License: BSD-3-Clause
- Website: www.joonet.de/lilo/
- Repository: salsa.debian.org/joowie-guest/upstream_lilo

LILO (Linux Loader) is a bootloader for Linux and was the default boot loader for most Linux distributions prior to the widespread adoption of GRUB in the early 2000s. Unlike loadlin, LILO allowed booting Linux without having DOS on the computer. As of 2009, most distributions have switched to GRUB as the default boot loader. Further development of LILO was discontinued in December 2015 along with a request by Joachim Wiedorn for potential developers.

== ELILO ==
elilo
- Developer: HP
- Stable release: 3.16 / March 29, 2013; 12 years ago
- Type: Bootloader
- License: GPL-2.0-or-later
- Website: sf.net/projects/elilo
- Repository: salsa.debian.org/joowie-guest/upstream_lilo

For EFI-based PC hardware the now orphaned ELILO boot loader was developed, originally by Hewlett-Packard for IA-64 systems, but later also for standard i386 and amd64 hardware with EFI support.

On any version of Linux running on Intel-based Apple Macintosh hardware, ELILO is one of the available bootloaders.

It supports network booting using TFTP/DHCP.

== See also ==
- /boot/
- Comparison of bootloaders
