= SBC =

SBC may refer to:

== Organizations ==
=== Education ===
- St Bernard's College, Lower Hutt, Wellington, New Zealand
- St. Brendan's College, Yeppoon, Queensland, Australia
- San Beda College, former name of San Beda University, Manila, Philippines
- Sarawak Biodiversity Centre, Malaysia
- Singapore Bible College
- Sino-British College, Shanghai, China
- Sitting Bull College, a tribal college, Fort Yates, North Dakota, US
- Steinbach Bible College, Manitoba, Canada
- Sweet Briar College, Sweet Briar, Virginia, US

=== Companies ===
- Sadharan Bima Corporation, Bangladesh
- SBC Cinemas, cinema chain in Taiwan, now part of Vue International
- SBC Telecom, a US telecom corporation
- Seattle's Best Coffee, American coffee retailer
- Security Bank Corporation, Philippines
- Service Bureau Corporation, former IBM subsidiary divested in 1973
- South Bay Conservatory, a performing arts company, Los Angeles, California, US
- Southwestern Bell Corporation, now AT&T Inc.
- Swiss Bank Corporation

==== Broadcasting ====
- Samoa Broadcasting Corporation
- Seychelles Broadcasting Corporation
- Shin-etsu Broadcasting, Nagano Prefecture, Japan
- Singapore Broadcasting Corporation, later Mediacorp
- Somali Broadcasting Corporation
- Saudi Broadcasting Corporation, former name of the Saudi Broadcasting Authority
- Swiss Broadcasting Corporation
- Seohae Broadcasting Corporation, a defunct radio station in North Jeolla Province, South Korea

=== Government ===
- Stevenage Borough Council, Hertfordshire, UK
- Scarborough Borough Council, North Yorkshire, UK
- Scottish Borders Council, UK

=== Sport ===
- Sandusky Bay Conference, a high school sports conference in Ohio, US
- Saint-Barthelemy Championships, the top division of association football in Saint Barthélemy, Caribbean
- Scottish Basketball Championship
- Sun Belt Conference, an American college sports conference

=== Other organizations ===
- Southern Baptist Convention, a US Christian denomination
- Satmar Bikur Cholim, a Jewish hospital aid organization
- Sociedade Brasileira de Computação (Brazilian Computer Society)

== Science and technology ==
- Schwarz Bayesian criterion, a tool of model selection in regression analysis
- Sensotronic Brake Control, an electro-hydraulic brake system
- Chevrolet small-block engine or Small Block Chevy, a type of automobile engine
- Standard bicarbonate concentration, in physiology
- Spectroscopic binary catalogue, containing orbital data for spectroscopic binary stars
- Sbc, in galaxy morphological classification, a galaxy type in the de Vaucouleurs system

=== Computing ===
- Session border controller, protecting VoIP networks
- Single-board computer
- Smart Bitrate Control, for video compression
- Sub-band coding, in signals
- SBC (codec), used by Bluetooth
- System basis chip, an integrated circuit

== Other uses ==
- Bengaluru City railway station (station code), India
- Curtiss SBC Helldiver, a US Navy bomber
- Stock-based compensation, employee compensation in stocks
- Suicide by cop (SbC)
