= Mercedes-Benz OM629 engine =

Mercedes-Benz OM629
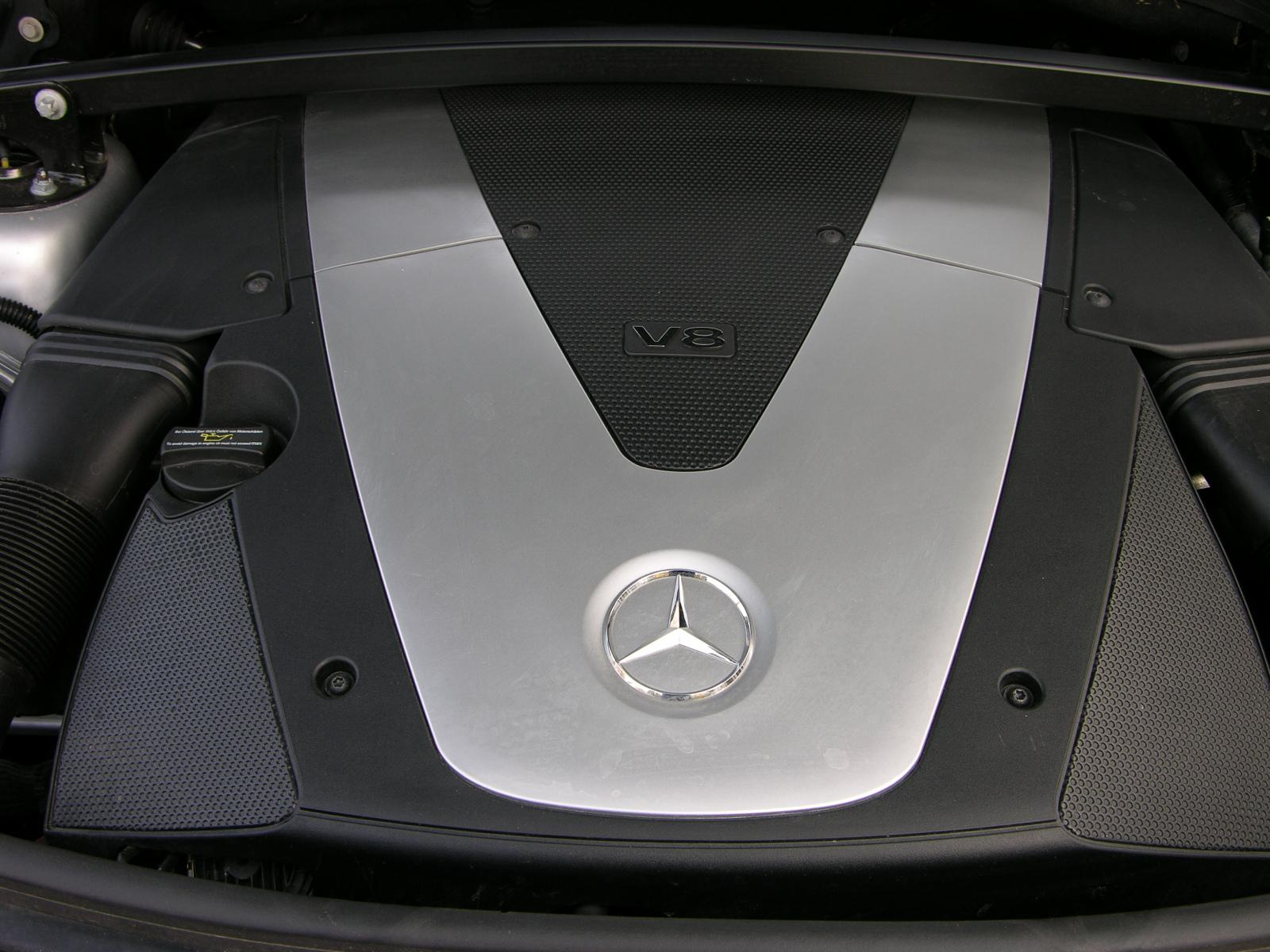

Overview
- Manufacturer: Mercedes-Benz
- Production: 2005–2013

Layout
- Configuration: 75° V8
- Displacement: 4.0 L (3,996 cc)
- Cylinder bore: 86 mm (3.39 in)
- Piston stroke: 86 mm (3.39 in)
- Cylinder block material: Aluminium alloy
- Valvetrain: DOHC 4 valves x cyl.
- Compression ratio: 17.0:1

Combustion
- Turbocharger: Variable-geometry
- Fuel system: Common rail
- Fuel type: Diesel
- Cooling system: Water cooled

Output
- Power output: 225–235 kW (306–320 PS; 302–315 hp)
- Torque output: 700–730 N⋅m (516–538 lb⋅ft)

Chronology
- Predecessor: Mercedes-Benz OM628
- Successor: Mercedes-Benz OM656

The Mercedes-Benz OM629 is a 4.0 litres (3,996 cc) diesel-fuelled, 4-stroke, compression-ignition internal combustion 75° 32-valve V8 engine used in the 2000s.

== Design ==
The block features an aluminium crankcase and cylinder heads. It uses aluminium sand casting in bedplate construction (divided at the height of the crankshaft) with wet cylinder liners made of cast iron.

The main bearings are reinforced, cast in GGG ductile cast iron. Rather than the usual 90° "vee" angle between the cylinder banks, a 75° angle was chosen due to the space available to install the engine. The consequence of this specific angle is free inertial forces of the first order. To compensate for this, the OM628 and OM629 use a balancer shaft located in the vee of the engine. To ensure even firing intervals the crankshaft uses split crank pins. The engine uses 97.0 mm cylinder spacing.

The engine uses dual overhead camshafts on each bank (‘quad-cam’) with four valves per cylinder, operated by hydraulic tappets. Each cylinder bank uses a variable geometry turbocharger. The compressed air from these is cooled by an air to water heat exchanger with an additional cold water circuit.

Compared to the OM628, the OM629 engine has an improved common-rail system, and higher boost from the turbochargers. It displaces 4.0 L (3,996 cc) and produces between 225 to 235 kW (306 to 320 PS; 302 to 315 hp) at 3600 rpm, and 700 to 730 N⋅m (516 to 538 lb⋅ft) of torque between 2000–2600 rpm.

== Models ==
Engine	Power	@ rpm	Torque	@ rpm	Years
OM629	225 kW (306 PS; 302 hp)	3,600	700 N⋅m (516 lb⋅ft)	2,000–2,600	2006–2010
OM629	231 kW (314 PS; 310 hp)	3,600	730 N⋅m (538 lb⋅ft)	2,200	2005–2009
OM629	235 kW (320 PS; 315 hp)	3,600	730 N⋅m (538 lb⋅ft)	2,200	2006–2010

=== OM629 (225 kW version) ===
- 2006–2009 X164 GL420 CDI
- 2007–2009 W164 ML420 CDI
- 2009–2010 X164 GL450 CDI
- 2009–2010 W164 ML450 CDI

=== OM629 (231 kW version) ===
- 2005–2009 W211 E420 CDI

=== OM629 (235 kW version) ===
- 2006–2009 W221 S420 CDI
- 2009–2010 W221 S450 CDI
