= Mercedes-Benz E-Class (W211) =

Third generation of Mercedes-Benz E-Class

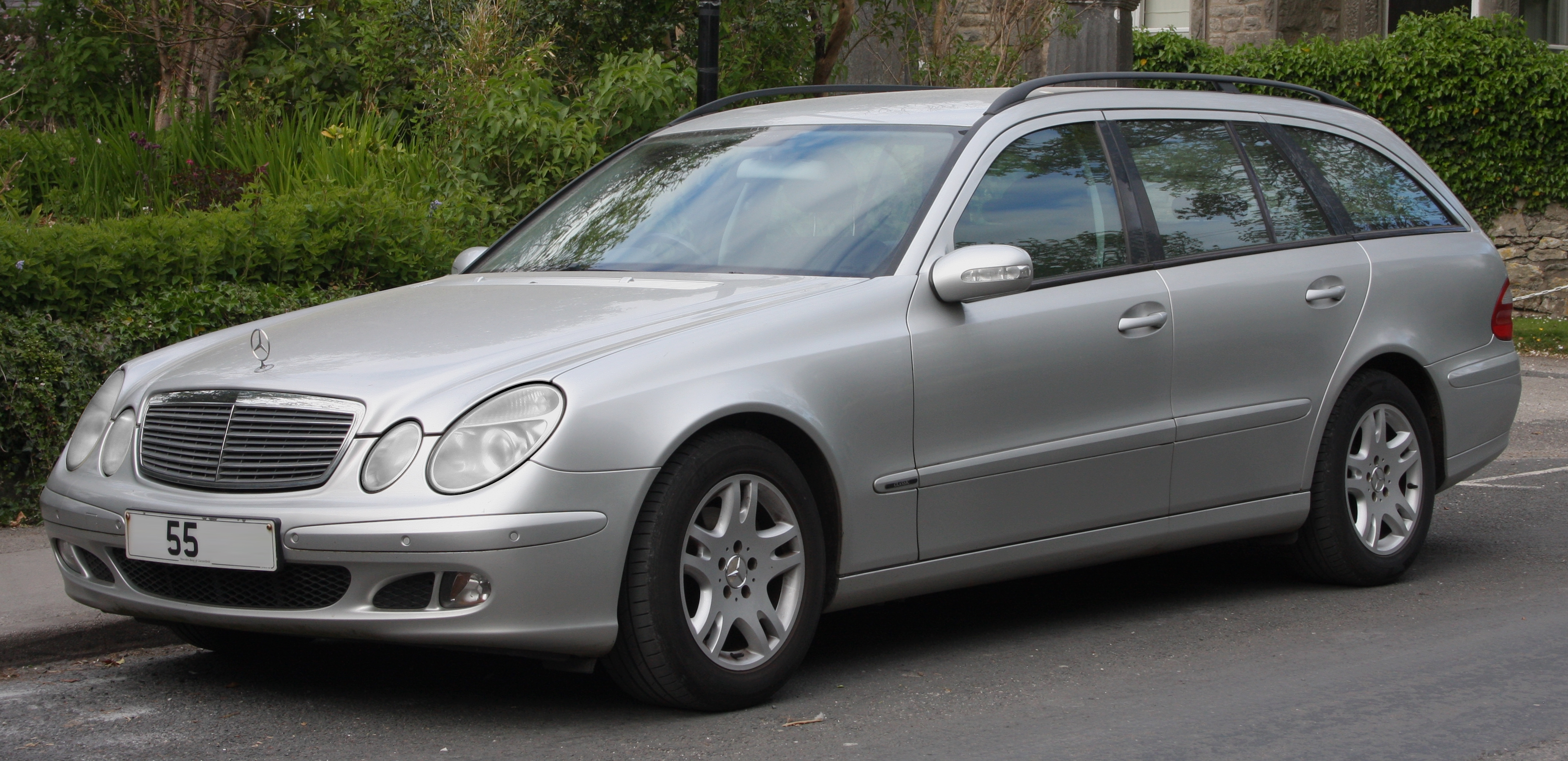

Overview
- Manufacturer: DaimlerChrysler (2002–2007); Daimler AG (2007–2009)
- Model code: W211 (Saloon); S211 (Wagon)
- Production: January 2002 – April 2009 (sedan); February 2002 – June 2009 (station wagon); 1.5 million built
- Model years: 2003–2009
- Assembly: Germany: Sindelfingen; Mexico: Santiago Tianguistenco; Mexico: Toluca; China: Beijing (Beijing Benz); Austria: Graz (Magna Steyr: 4Matic Only); Egypt: 6th of October City (EGA); Iran: Tehran (Top Khodro); Malaysia: Johor Bahru (OASB); Malaysia: Pekan (DRB-HICOM); Indonesia: Bogor (MBI); Thailand: Samut Prakan (TAAP: E200 NGT)
- Designer: Hartmut Sinkwitz (1999)

Body and chassis
- Class: Executive car (E)
- Body style: 4-door saloon 5-door station wagon
- Layout: Front-engine, rear-wheel-drive / four-wheel drive (4Matic)
- Related: Mercedes-Benz CLK-Class (C209); Mercedes-Benz CLS-Class (C219); Chrysler 300; Dodge Charger (LX/LD); Dodge Magnum; SsangYong Chairman (Second generation)

Powertrain
- Engine: Petrol; 1.8 L M271 supercharged I4; 2.6–3.2 L M112 V6; 2.5–3.5 L M272 V6; 5.0 L M113 V8; 5.4 L M113k supercharged V8; 5.5 L M273 V8; 6.2 L M156 V8; Petrol / CNG: 1.8 L M271 supercharged I4; Diesel; 2.1 L OM646 turbo I4; 2.7 L OM647 turbo I5; 3.0 L OM642 turbo V6; 3.2 L OM648 turbo I6; 4.0 L OM628/OM629 turbo V8
- Transmission: 6-speed manual; 6-speed Sequentronic automated manual; 5-speed 5G-Tronic automatic; 7-speed 7G-Tronic automatic

Dimensions
- Wheelbase: 2,854 mm (112.4 in)
- Length: 2003–06 Sedan: 190.3 in (4,834 mm); 2007–09 Sedan: 191.0 in (4,851 mm); 2004–06 Wagon: 191.7 in (4,869 mm); 2007–09 Wagon: 192.3 in (4,884 mm)
- Width: 2003–04: 71.3 in (1,811 mm); 2005–09: 71.7 in (1,821 mm)
- Height: 2003–06 Sedan: 57.0 in (1,448 mm); 2007–09 Sedan: 58.4 in (1,483 mm); 2007–09 Wagon: 59.3 in (1,506 mm); 2004–09 Wagon: 58.9 in (1,496 mm); AMG: 57.2 in (1,453 mm)
- Curb weight: 1,560–1,819 kg (3,439.2–4,010.2 lb)

Chronology
- Predecessor: Mercedes-Benz E-Class (W210)
- Successor: Mercedes-Benz E-Class (W212)

The Mercedes-Benz W211 is the third generation Mercedes-Benz E-Class made from 2002 to 2009 in sedan/saloon and station wagon/estate configurations – replacing the W210 E-Class models and superseded by the Mercedes-Benz W212 in 2009.

The C219, marketed as the CLS, was introduced as a niche model in 2005, based on W211 mechanicals.

Launched in 2002 for the 2003 model year, the W211 E-Class was another evolution of the previous model. Before North American sales began, the car was shown in the 2002 movie Men in Black II. The W211 development program began in 1997, followed by design work. The final designs were chosen in 1999, and German patents were filed on December 18, 2000 utilizing an E 500 prototype. Development ended in 2001 after 48 months, at a total cost of €2 billion. Pilot production went into testing in the summer of 2001, and the W211 E-Class debuted at the Brussels Motor Show in January 2002.

== 2003–2005 ==
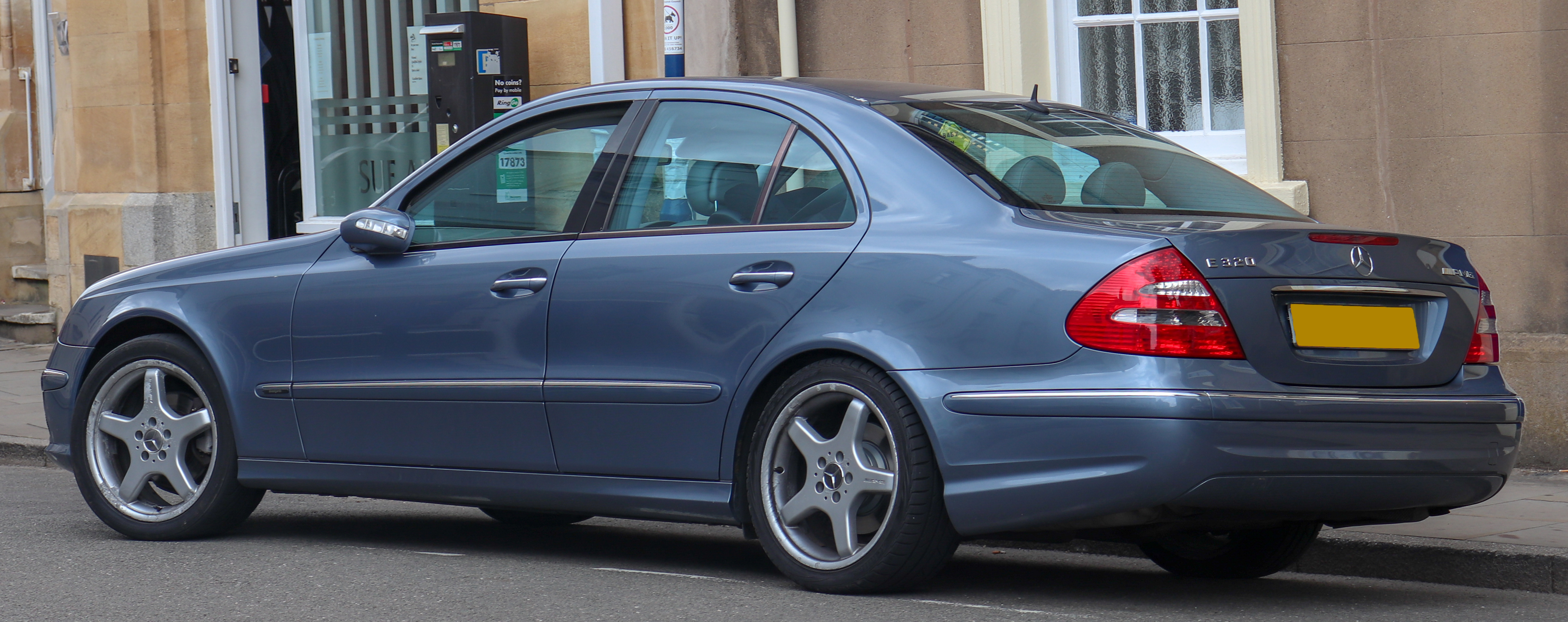

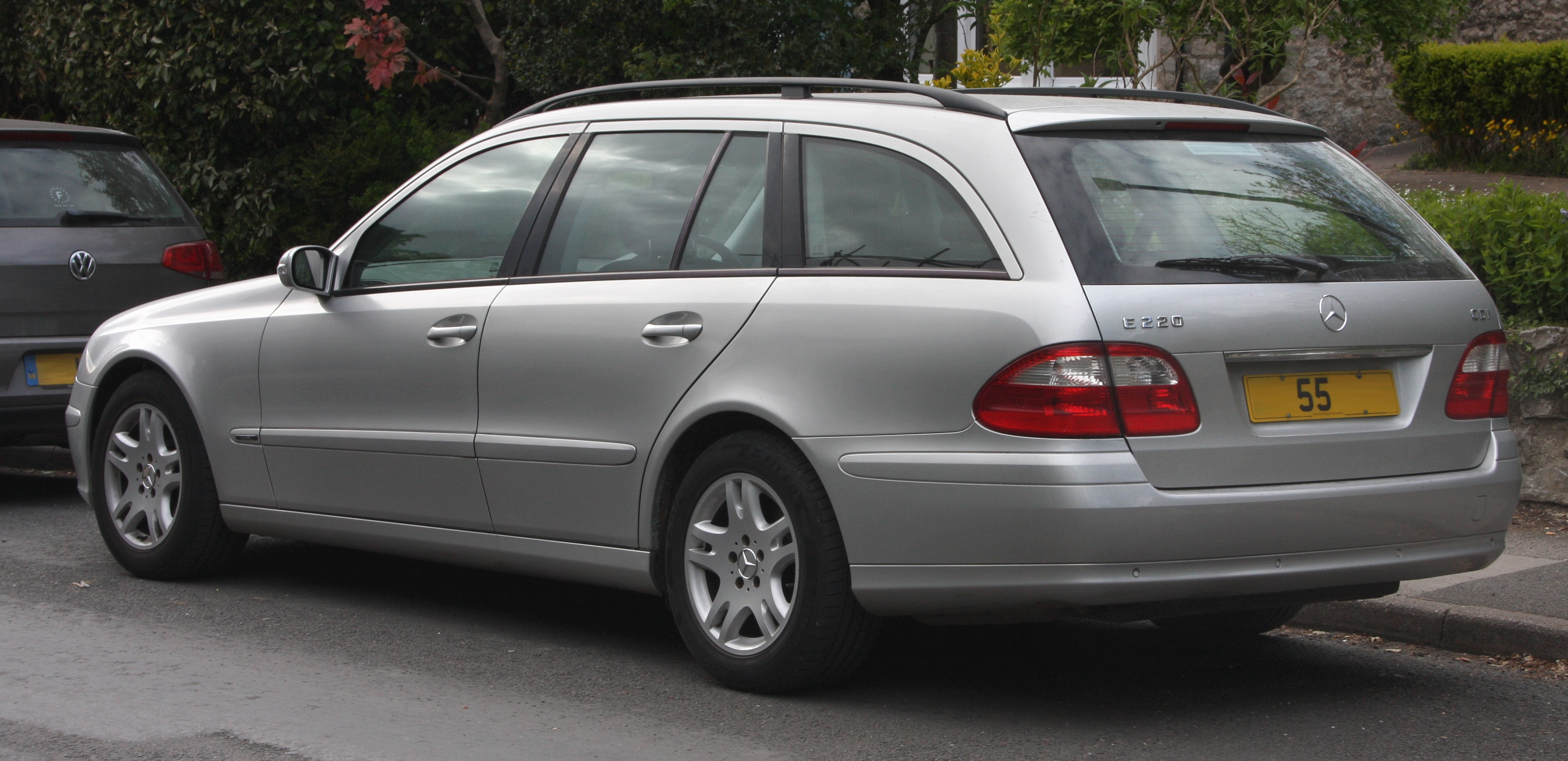
The W/S211 looked similar to the previous generation, but with a more modern and polished design.

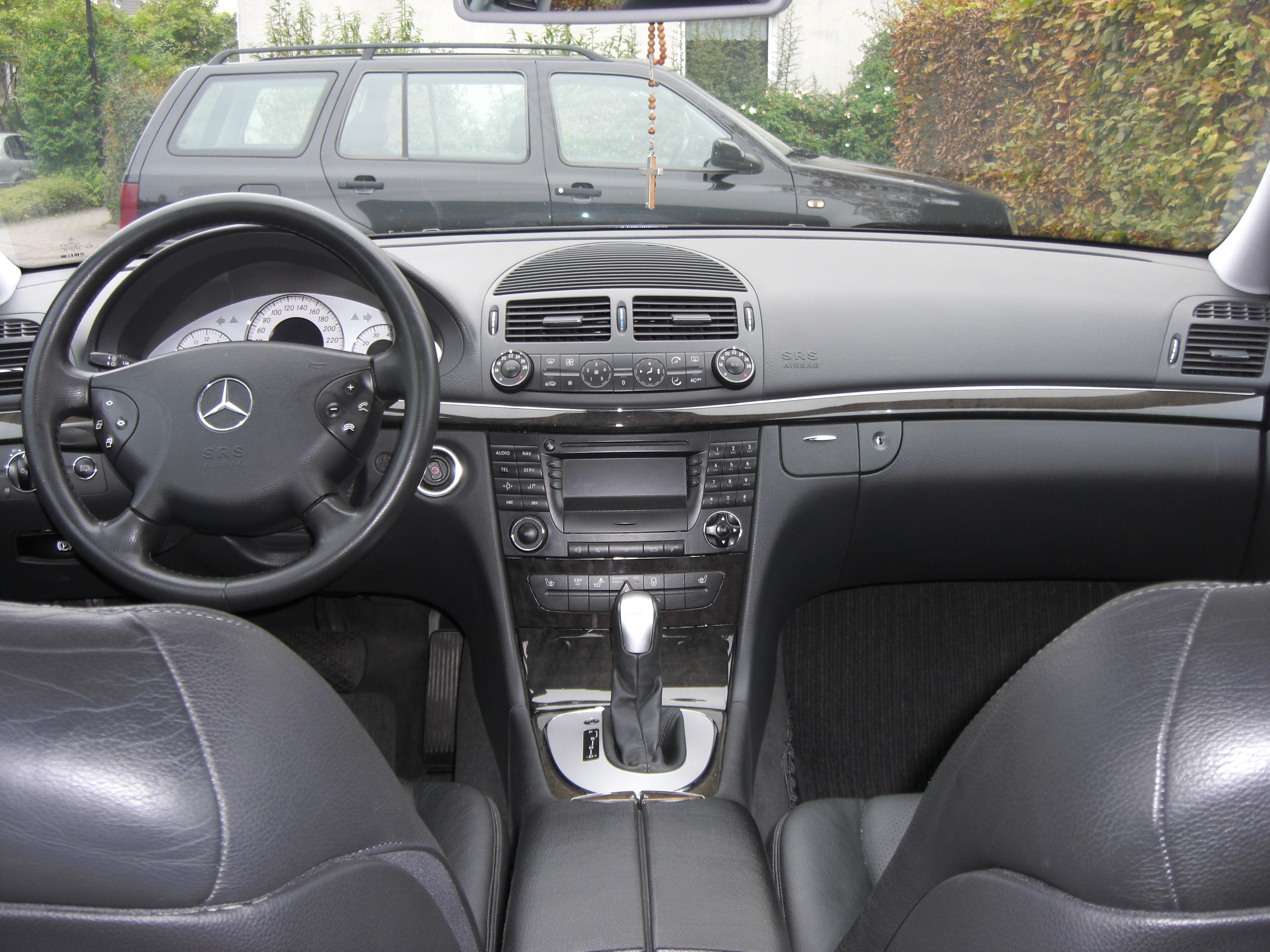
Interior

The W211 E-Class was unveiled at the January 2002 European Motor Show Brussels featuring twin-headlights, angled slightly rearward. The 2003 E-Class was larger than its predecessors while offering less interior space, particularly in the estate version, than the W210 it replaced. It offered petrol or diesel engines with a choice of rear or four-wheel drive.

Mercedes-Benz claimed to have reduced the fuel consumption of the new E-Class by up to 0.9 litres per 100 km compared with the outgoing model. The redesigned 2003 model featured electrohydraulic braking system marketed as Sensotronic Brake Control (SBC), which was standard equipment in the E-Class. Options included multicontour front seats and dual control air suspension system marketed as Airmatic DC.

Air suspension was standard equipment in the top-of-the-range E 500 V8 model and was available as an option on all other E-Class models. The W211 is a more complex car than its predecessor, with a programmable serial bus and many automated systems.

The 2003 E-Class was offered in sedan and 5-door station wagon configurations in three trim lines, marketed as Classic, Elegance, and Avantgarde. The W211 was the first E-Class since 1985 equipped with two windshield wipers.

The transmission options were 5 or 7-speed automatic or 6-speed manual. V6, V8, inline-4, and supercharged inline-4 engines were offered. Engine outputs of E 240 and E 270 models from the previous W210 E-Class were given a 5 kW increase to 130 kW, while the E 500 uses the 225 kW 5.0-litre V8 from the W220 S-Class to supersede the W210 E 430. The E 320 remained unchanged, producing 165 kW of power.

=== E 320 CDI ===
The E 320 CDI used the 3,222 cc (3.222 L; 196.6 cu in) in-line 6-cylinder diesel engine, OM648, that made 204 PS (150 kW; 201 hp) at 4,200 rpm and 500 N⋅m (369 lb⋅ft) at 1,800–2,600 rpm.

Engines were updated as part of the facelift, and the new 320 CDI was powered by a 2987 cc OM642 V6 engine delivering 224 hp at 3,800 rpm and 540 N⋅m (398 lb⋅ft) at 1,600–2,800 rpm.

=== E 400 CDI ===
The E 400 CDI used Mercedes-Benz's OM628 3,996 cc (3.996 L; 243.9 cu in) V8 diesel engine, that made 260 PS (191 kW; 256 hp) at 4,000 rpm and 560 N⋅m (413 lb⋅ft) at 1,700–2,600 rpm.

=== E 55 AMG (2003–2006) ===
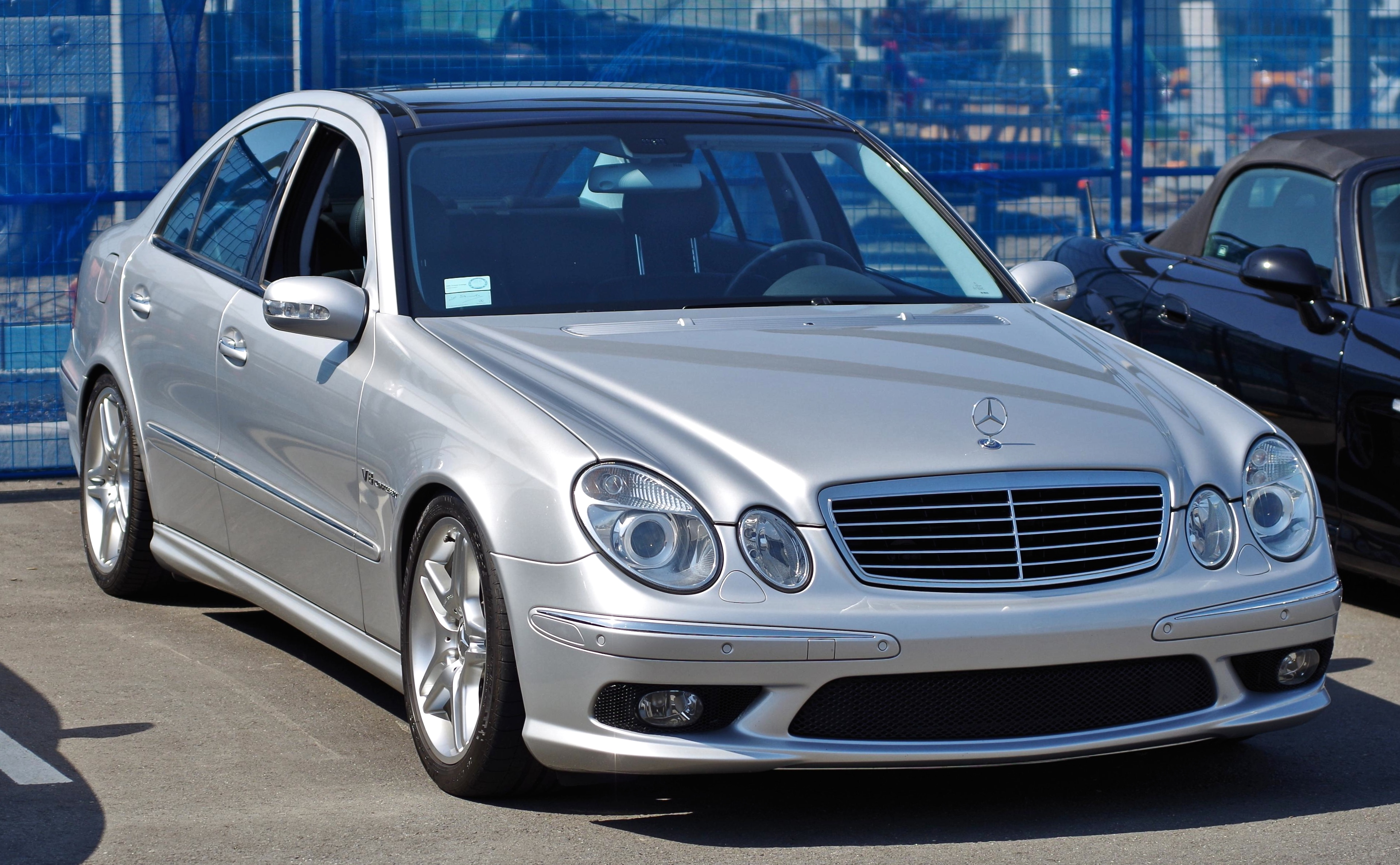

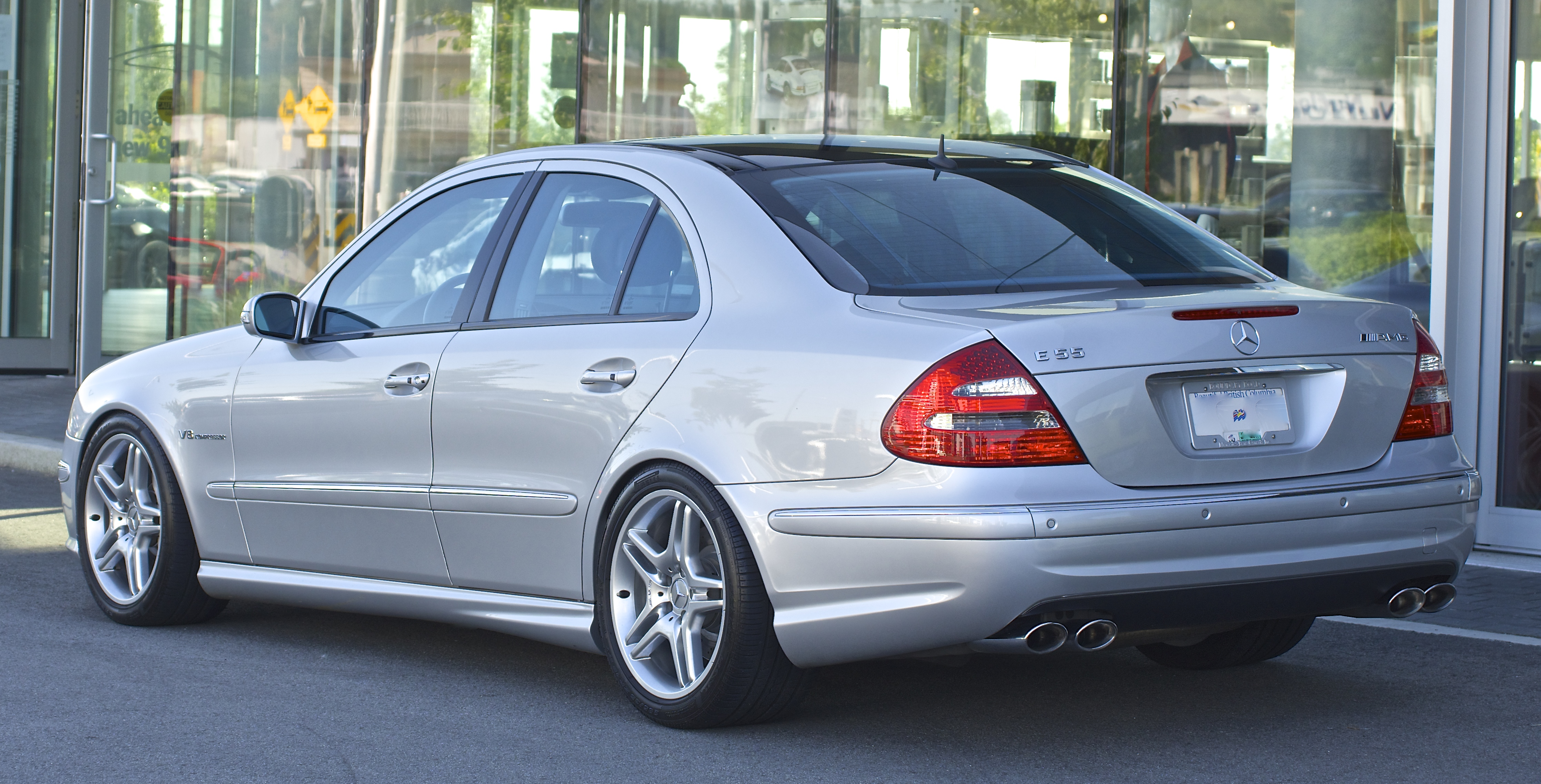
Pre-facelift E 55 AMG (North America)

The second generation E 55 AMG debuted in September 2002 at the Paris Motor Show. It debuted as the fastest production sedan in the world. The E 55 AMG was also offered in an estate version for later model years.

==== E 55 powertrain ====
The E 55 AMG is powered by the M113K engine, a 5.4 L V8 with a Lysholm type supercharger manufactured by IHI. The E 55's engine won International Performance Engine of the Year for 2003. The E 55's engine, although the same as the one in the SL55 AMG, had less horsepower, at 476 PS (350 kW; 469 hp) and 516 lb⋅ft (700 N⋅m) of torque. The difference in power is due to a smaller-diameter, longer-length exhaust system in the E 55.

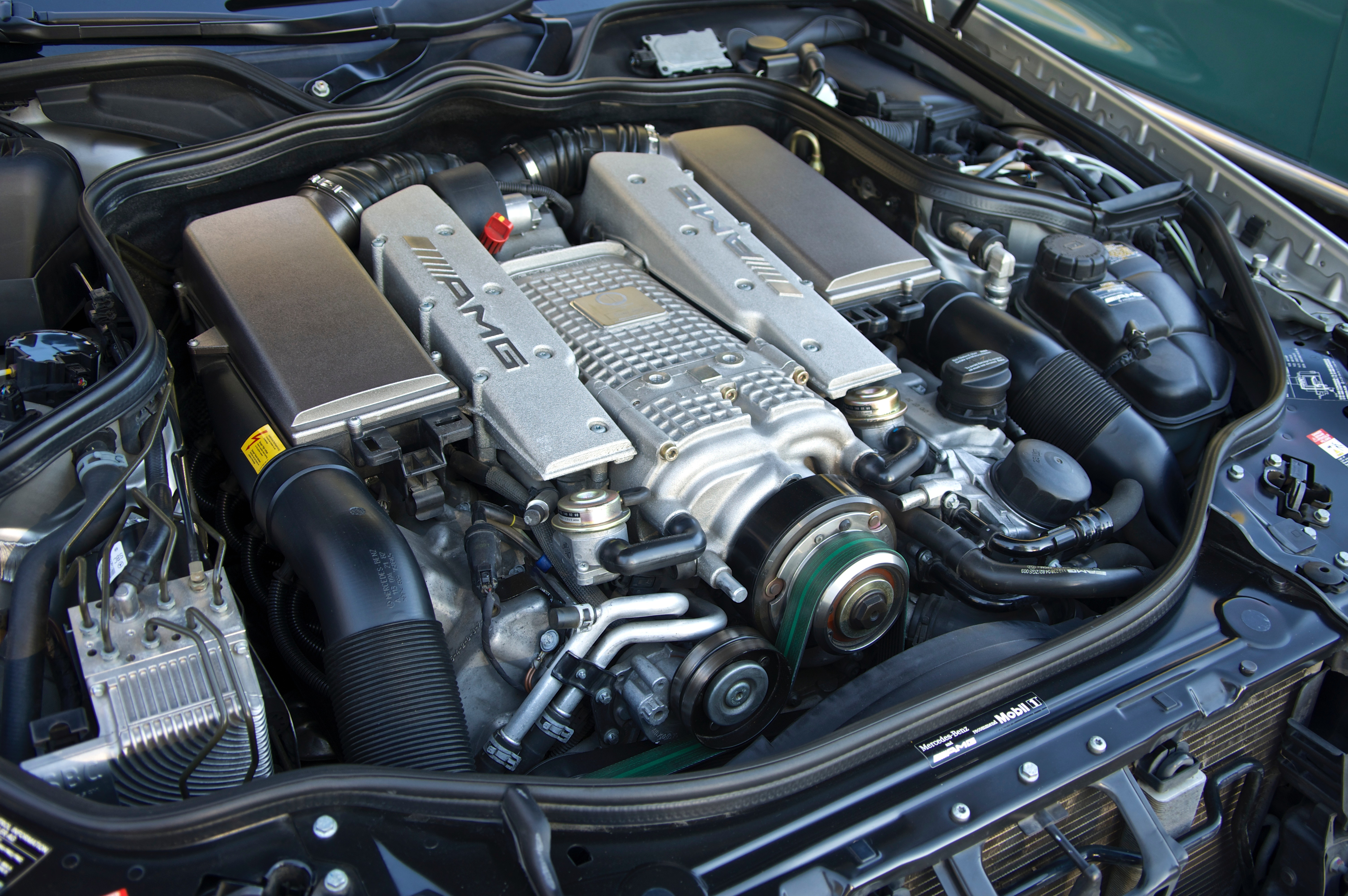
E 55 AMG engine with front cover removed showing supercharger

The supercharged 5.4 L V8 engine was mated to the Speedshift 5-speed automatic transmission, which has a torque capacity of 796 lb⋅ft (1,079 N⋅m), as the newer 7G-Tronic introduced in 2003 is limited to 542 lb⋅ft (735 N⋅m), not enough to handle the torque from the supercharged V8.

==== E 55 suspension, brakes, wheels & tires ====
The E 55 came with an AMG tuned Airmatic suspension with 3 different driving modes as well as the ability to raise the car. The E 55 was equipped with SBC (Sensotronic Brake Control) and uses Brembo manufactured calipers for both the front and the rear brakes. The front brakes on the E 55 consist of 14.2 in (360 mm) cross drilled disc brakes and 8 piston calipers, while the rear brakes consist of 13-inch (330 mm) discs and 4 piston calipers. The E 55 came with 245/40/18 tires up front and 265/35/18 in the rear with performance tires on the standard AMG 18" split spoke wheels.

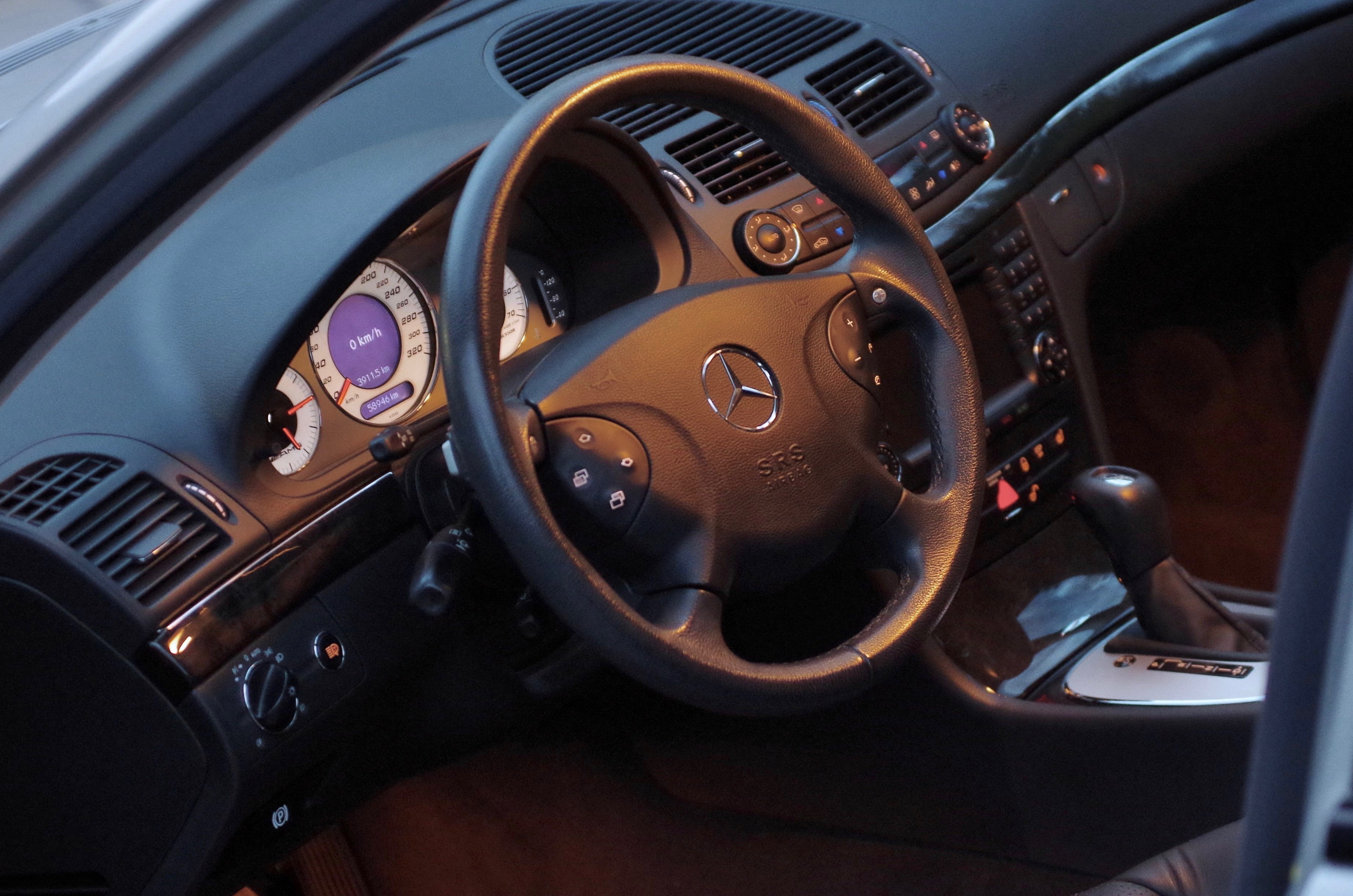
Interior of a 2004 E 55 AMG

==== E 55 Performance ====
Car and Driver reported in their testing that the E 55 AMG was faster than the SL55 AMG. The E 55 AMG was the fastest four door car in Mercedes-Benz's lineup at the time. While the E 55 could accelerate from 0-100 mph (161 km/h) in 9.8 seconds, it took the Audi RS6 11 seconds. The E 55 was the fastest production sedan available until Mercedes-Benz released the S65 AMG. However, Car and Driver criticized the brakes on the E 55, chastising them for being difficult to modulate, and said that the car as a whole felt 'aloof'.

Car and Driver also tested an E 55 AMG Wagon, which weighs 256 lb (116 kg) more than the sedan. They found that it accelerated from 0–60 mph (0–97 km/h) in 4.1 seconds and 0–100 mph (0–161 km/h) in 9.7 seconds.

The E 55 was a sales success, being the best selling AMG until the release of the C 63 AMG.

== 2006–2009 (Mid-generational refresh) ==
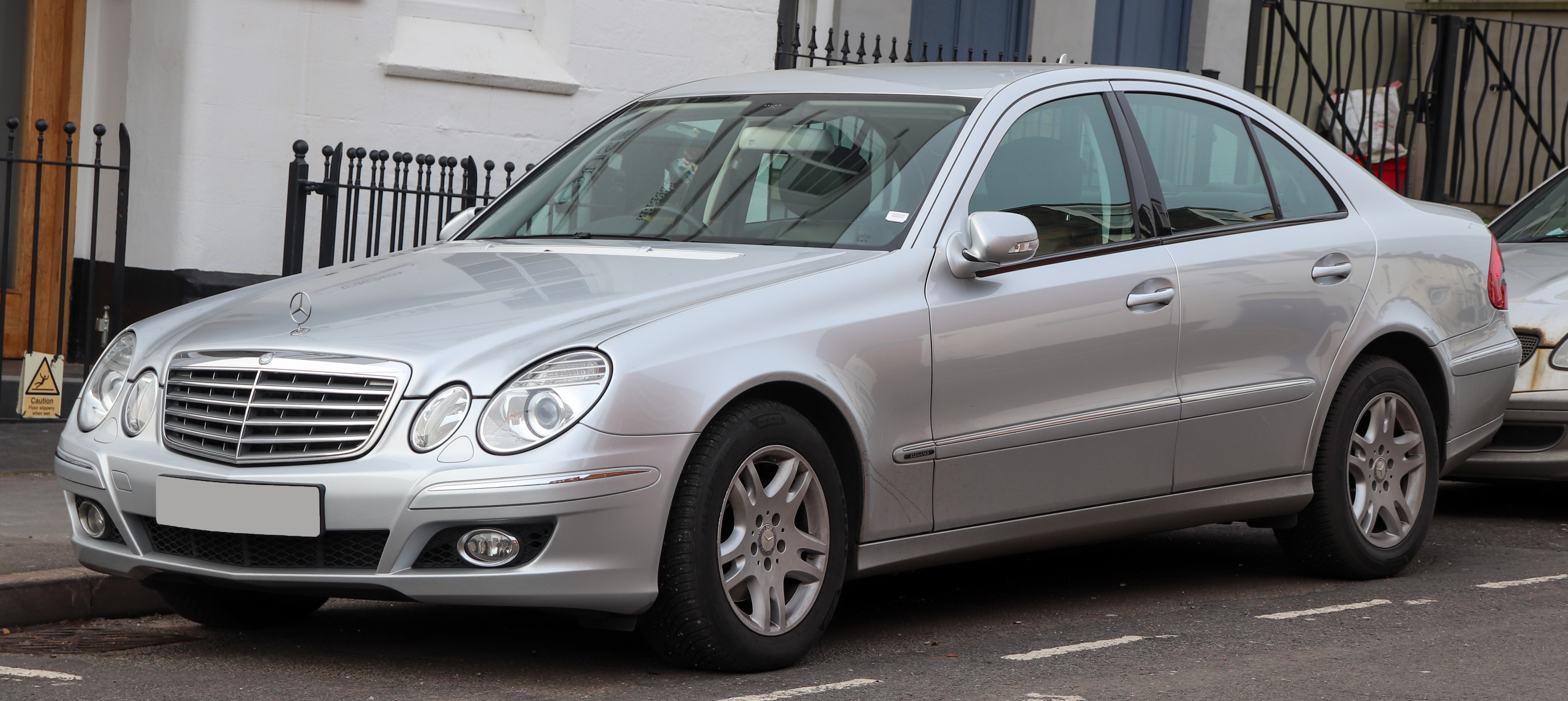
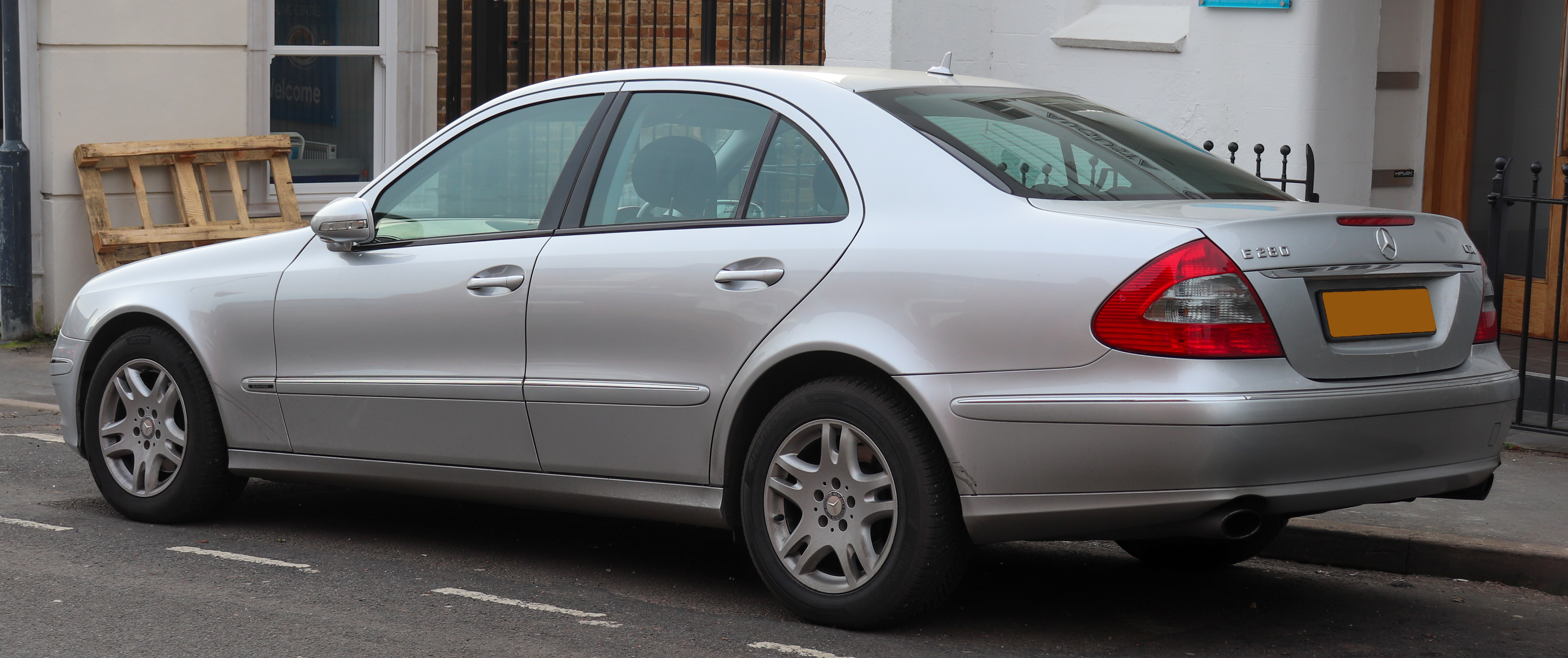

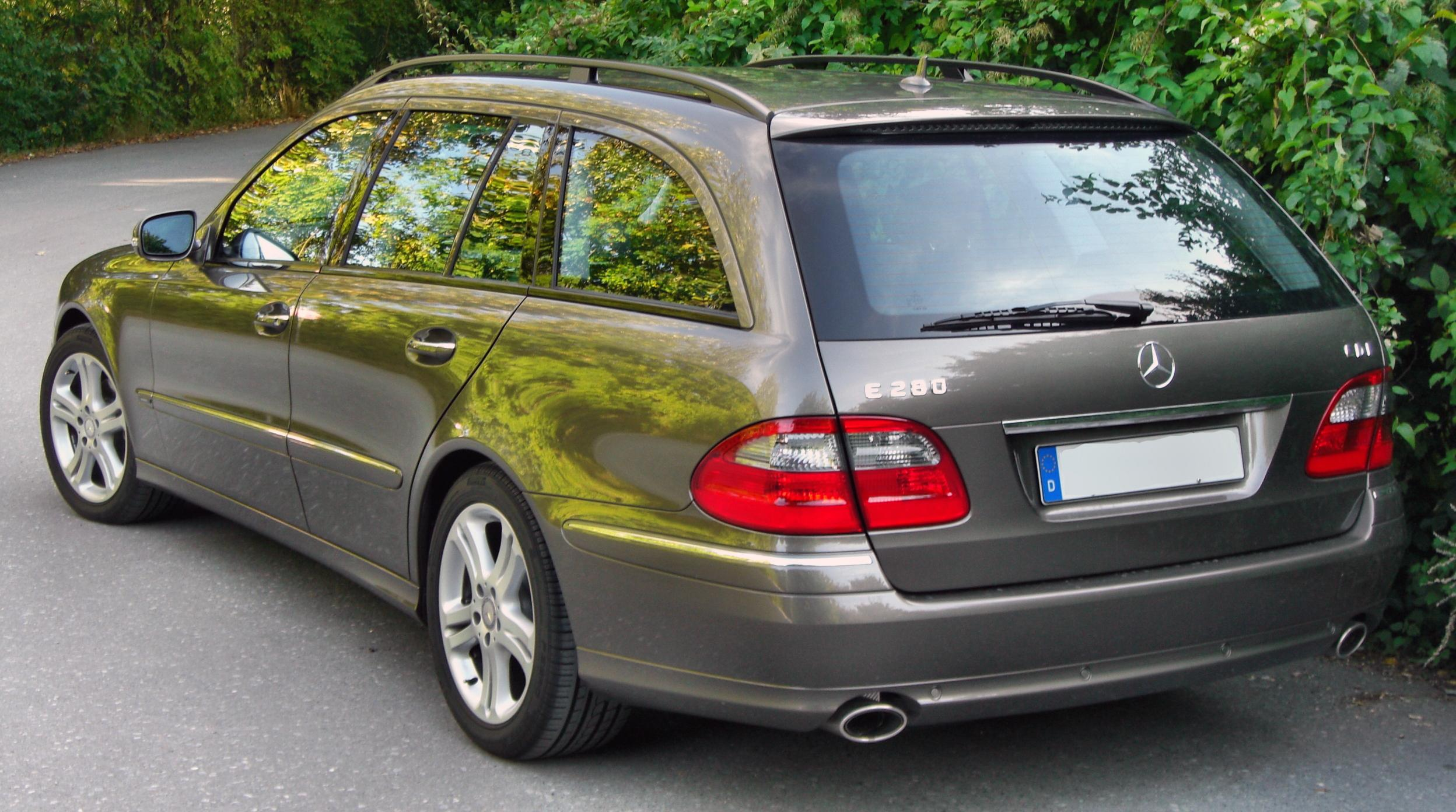
The facelifted version had a new upright grille and a new front bumper.

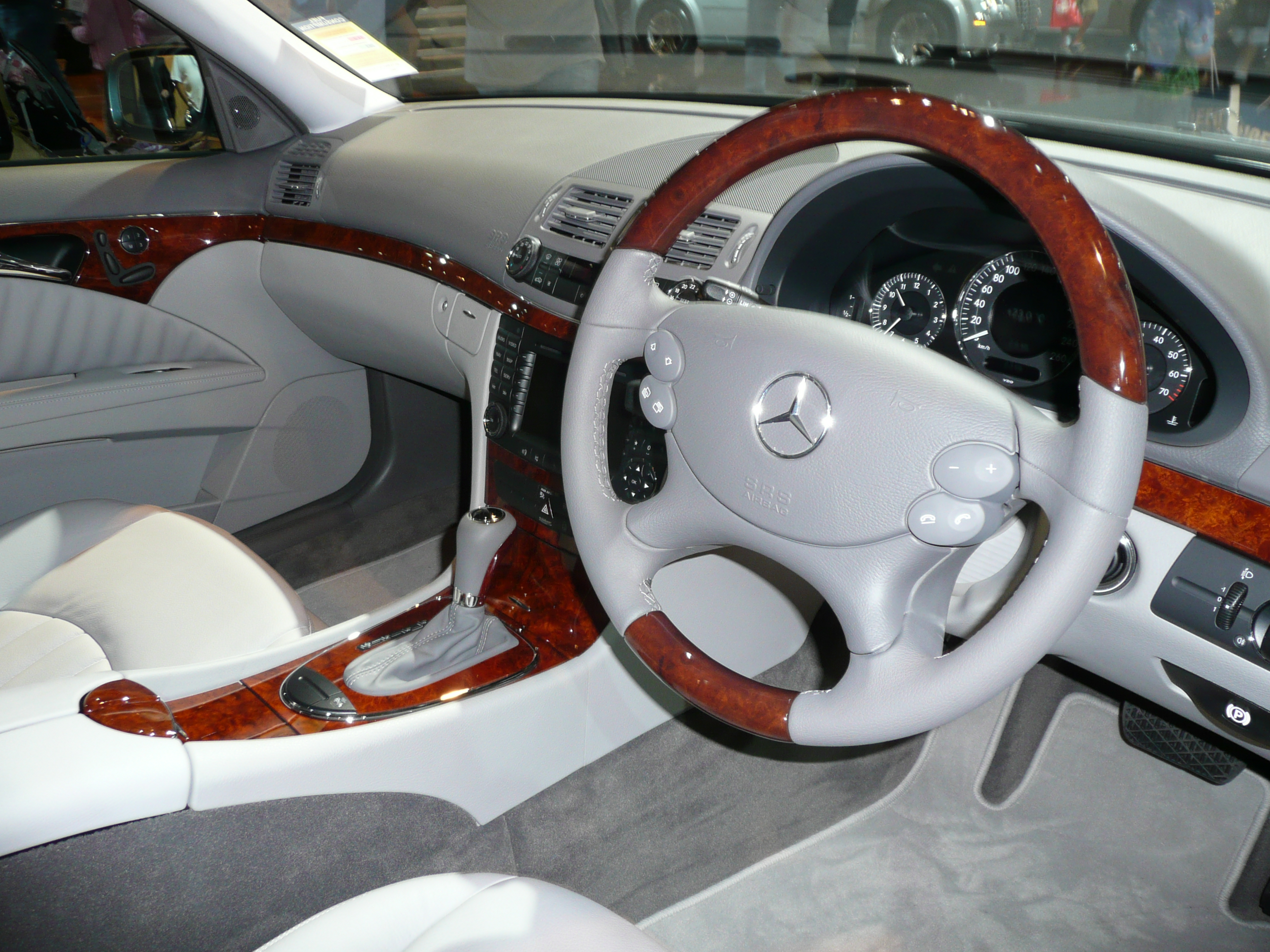
Interior

The W211 was updated in 2006 for the 2007 model year. There was new standard and optional equipment, which enabled the W211 to hold its own against its competitors. Sensotronic was dropped due to customer complaints about its software, while Pre-Safe (w/o autonomous braking) was made standard. The announced vehicle was unveiled at the 2006 New York International Auto Show. In total, 29 model variants were available, with 16 Saloons and 13 Estates. New standard equipment included PRE-SAFE active protection, NECK-PRO head restraints, flashing brake lights, tyre pressure monitor. The optional Intelligent Light System included bi-xenon headlamps and 5 different lighting functions. The bodies were restyled including the front grille, rear view mirror, side mirrors, redesigned headlamps, front spoiler, rear lights, gear knob and steering wheel.

Coinciding with the minor model update, the largest factory built engine in the E-class range, the E 500 (badged E 550 in some countries), had its engine size increased from 5 litres to 5.5 litres in 2006.

=== E 63 AMG (2007–2009) ===
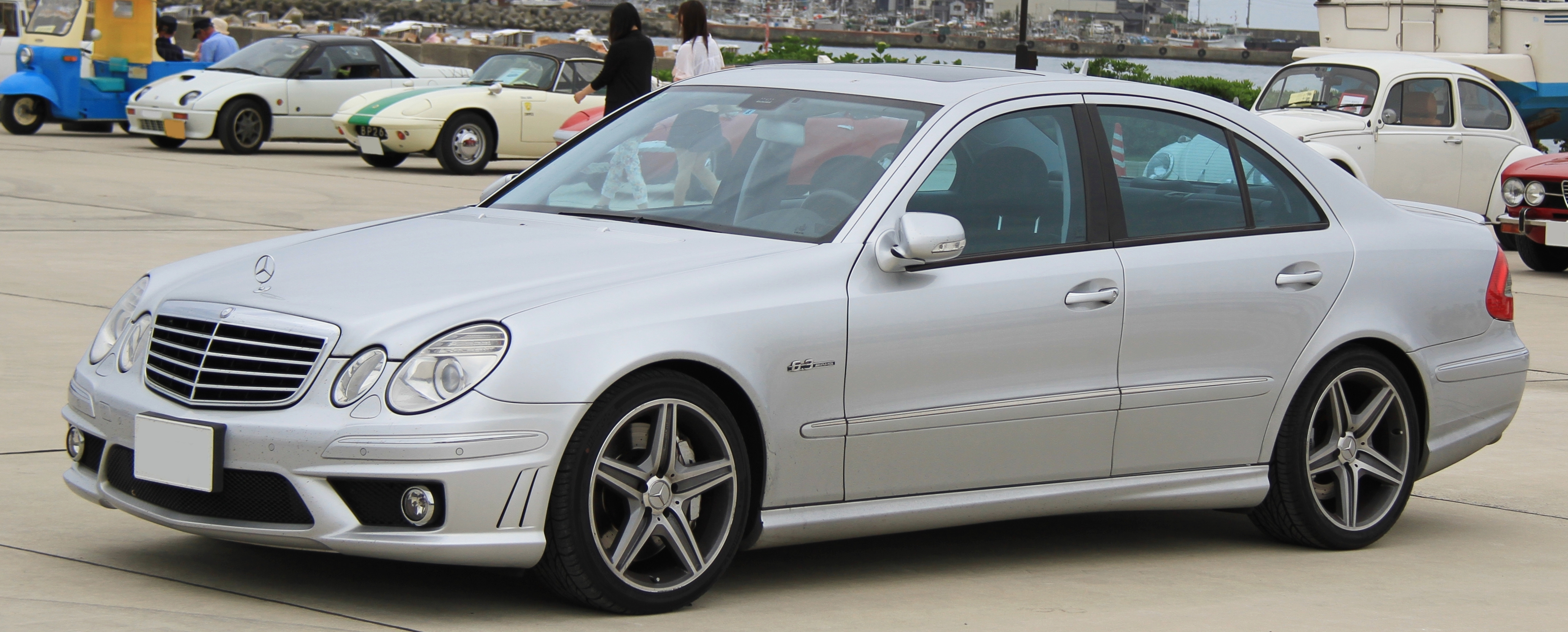

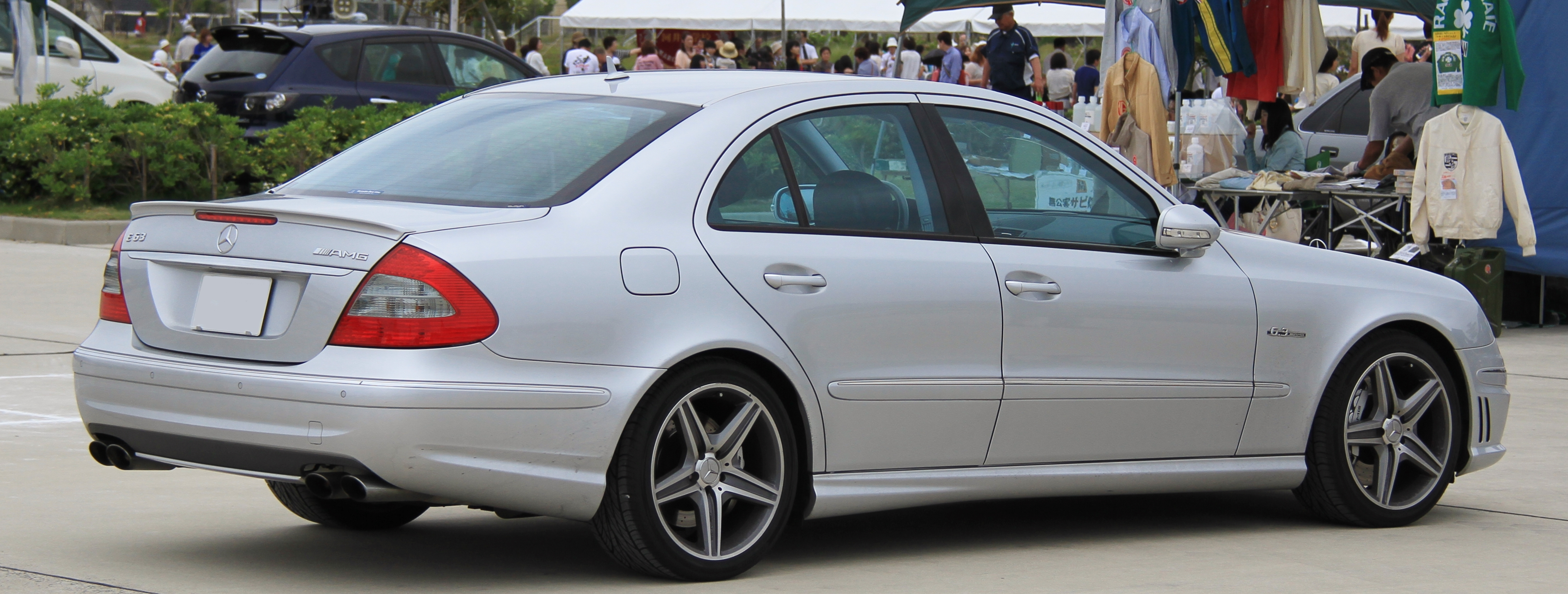
Facelift Mercedes-Benz E 63 AMG (Japan)

The E 63 AMG was the refreshed high-performance model of the W211, replacing the E 55 AMG. Besides the Saloon, it was also offered in the Estate body style similarly to the E 55 AMG estate model to compete with the new wagon versions of the BMW M5 (E61) and Audi RS 6 (C6), though those two high-performance wagons were never sold in North America.

This engine had a high-pressure die-cast alloy cylinder block with twin-wire arc spray coated running surfaces. Compression ratio is 11.3:1. According to many auto journalists, the E 63 AMG was one of the quickest production sports sedans in the world. Both the sedan (saloon) and wagon had a 0–60 mph (97 km/h) acceleration time of 4.3 seconds. Compared to the previous E 55 AMG, the E 63 AMG had more horsepower but less torque, enabling it to be mated to the newer 7G-Tronic automatic transmission.

While the E 500 and E 550 had the standard Mercedes Airmatic DC suspension with adaptive damping, the E 63 AMG had the AMG-tuned Airmatic suspension which with the stability control turned off gave it far better driving dynamics than its non-AMG predecessors.

The AMG Performance package P030 added electronic speed limiter deletion, limited-slip rear differential, Alcantara sports steering wheel, stiffer valving Airmatic suspension over the standard AMG tuned Airmatic, AMG 18-inch (460 mm), 5-spoke multi-piece wheels, and optional AMG carbon fibre trim.

=== E-Guard (2006–2008) ===
The E-Guard was an armoured version with category B4 protection level, introduced in July 2006. Engine choices included E 320 CDI, E 350, and E 500. The vehicles were reinforced with steel and aramid. Other safety equipment included Michelin MOExtended run-flat tyres with pressure loss warning system. All three models had an electronically limited top speed of 240 km/h (149 mph).

=== E 300 BlueTEC (2007–2009) ===
Common rail Direct Injection with a 7G-Tronic automatic transmission, launched in the US as the E 320 BlueTEC in 2007 and in Europe as the E 300 BlueTEC in 2008. The W211 never had a urea injection system throughout its production. The Bluetec name was only adopted to have consistency between the petrol and diesel nomenclature.

== Engines ==
=== Engines ===
There was a wider range of engines available in Europe than North America and other markets.

Model (model years)	Type	Power at rpm	Torque at rpm	0–100 km/h (0–62 mph) (seconds)	Drive
Petrol engines
E 200 KOMPRESSOR (2003–2006)	1.8 L (1,796 cc; 109.6 cu in) M271 KE18ML Supercharged I4	163 PS (120 kW; 161 hp)	240 N⋅m (177 lb⋅ft)	10.7	RWD
E 200 KOMPRESSOR (2006–2009)	1.8 L (1,796 cc; 109.6 cu in) M271 KE18ML Supercharged I4	184 PS (135 kW; 181 hp)	250 N⋅m (184 lb⋅ft)	9.1 – 9.4	RWD
E 230 (2007–2009)	2.5 L (2,496 cc; 152.3 cu in) M272 E25 V6	204 PS (150 kW; 201 hp) at 6,100	245 N⋅m (181 lb⋅ft) at 2,900–5,500	8.9 – 9.1	RWD
E 240 (2003–2005)	2.6 L (2,598 cc; 158.5 cu in) M112 E26 V6	177 PS (130 kW; 175 hp) at 6,200	245 N⋅m (181 lb⋅ft) at 2,900	8.9 – 10.6	RWD & 4WD
E 280 (2006–2009)	3.0 L (2,996 cc; 182.8 cu in) M272 E30 V6	231 PS (170 kW; 228 hp) at 6,000	300 N⋅m (221 lb⋅ft) at 2,700–5,000	7.3 – 7.8	RWD & 4WD
E 320 (2003–2005)	3.2 L (3,199 cc; 195.2 cu in) M112 E32 V6	221 PS (163 kW; 218 hp) at 5,600	315 N⋅m (232 lb⋅ft) at 3,000–4,800	7.7 –8.4	RWD & 4WD
E 350 (2005–2009)	3.5 L (3,498 cc; 213.5 cu in) M272 E35 V6	272 PS (200 kW; 268 hp) at 6,000	350 N⋅m (258 lb⋅ft) at 2,400–5,000	6.9 – 7.1	RWD & 4WD
E 350 CGI (2007–2009)	3.5 L (3,498 cc; 213.5 cu in) M272 E35 V6	292 PS (215 kW; 288 hp) at 6,400	365 N⋅m (269 lb⋅ft) at 3,000–5,100	6.8	RWD
E 500 (2003–2006)	5.0 L (4,966 cc; 303.0 cu in) M113 E50 V8	306 PS (225 kW; 302 hp) at 5,600	460 N⋅m (339 lb⋅ft) at 2,700	6.0 – 6.3	RWD & 4WD
E 500 (E 550 in US/Canada) (2006–2009)	5.5 L (5,461 cc; 333.3 cu in) M273 E55 V8	387 PS (285 kW; 382 hp) at 6,000	530 N⋅m (391 lb⋅ft) at 2,800	4.8 – 5.3	RWD & 4WD
E 55 AMG (2003–2006)	5.4 L (5,439 cc; 331.9 cu in) M113 E55 Supercharged V8	476 PS (350 kW; 469 hp) at 6,100	700 N⋅m (516 lb⋅ft) at 2,650	4.3	RWD
E 63 AMG (2006–2009)	6.2 L (6,208 cc; 378.8 cu in) M156 V8	514 PS (378 kW; 507 hp) at 6,800	630 N⋅m (465 lb⋅ft) at 5,200	4.5 (4.6 for Estate version)	RWD
Petrol/CNG engines
E 200 NGT BlueEFFICIENCY	1.8 L (1,796 cc; 109.6 cu in) M271 KE18ML Supercharged I4	163 PS (120 kW; 161 hp)	240 N⋅m (177 lb⋅ft)	10.7	RWD
Diesel engines
E 200 CDI (2003–2005)	2.1 L (2,148 cc; 131.1 cu in) OM646 DE22 LA R I4	122 PS (90 kW; 120 hp) at 4,200	270 N⋅m (199 lb⋅ft)	12.1	RWD
E 200 CDI (2006–2009)	2.1 L (2,148 cc; 131.1 cu in) OM646 DE22 LA EVO R I4	136 PS (100 kW; 134 hp) at 3,800	340 N⋅m (251 lb⋅ft)	9.9	RWD
E 220 CDI (2003–2005)	2.1 L (2,148 cc; 131.1 cu in) OM646 DE22 LA I4	150 PS (110 kW; 148 hp) at 3,800 - 4,200	340 N⋅m (251 lb⋅ft)	10.6	RWD
E 220 CDI (2006–2009)	2.1 L (2,148 cc; 131.1 cu in) OM646 DE22 LA EVO I4	170 PS (125 kW; 168 hp) at 3,800	400 N⋅m (295 lb⋅ft)	9.1	RWD
E 270 CDI (2003–2005)	2.7 L (2,685 cc; 163.8 cu in) OM647 DE27 I5	177 PS (130 kW; 175 hp) at 4,200	400–425 N⋅m (295–313 lb⋅ft)	9.3	RWD
E 280 CDI (2004–2005)	3.2 L (3,222 cc; 196.6 cu in) OM648 DE32 LA I6	177 PS (130 kW; 175 hp) at 4,200	425 N⋅m (313 lb⋅ft)	7.6 – 8.6	RWD
E 280 CDI (2005–2009)	3.0 L (2,987 cc; 182.3 cu in) OM642 DE30 V6	190 PS (140 kW; 187 hp) at 4,000	440 N⋅m (325 lb⋅ft)	7.0 – 7.4	RWD & 4WD
E 300 BlueTEC (2007–2008)	3.0 L (2,987 cc; 182.3 cu in) OM642 DE30 V6	211 PS (155 kW; 208 hp) at 3,400	540 N⋅m (398 lb⋅ft) at 1,600–2,400	7.2	RWD
E 320 BlueTEC (2006–2009)	3.0 L (2,987 cc; 182.3 cu in) OM642 DE30 V6	208 PS (153 kW; 205 hp) at 3,800	540 N⋅m (398 lb⋅ft) at 1,600–2,400	7.2	RWD
E 320 CDI (2003–2005)	3.2 L (3,222 cc; 196.6 cu in) OM648 DE32 LA I6	204 PS (150 kW; 201 hp) at 4,200	500 N⋅m (369 lb⋅ft) at 1,800–2,600	7.7	RWD
E 320 CDI (2006–2009)	3.0 L (2,987 cc; 182.3 cu in) OM642 DE30 V6	224 PS (165 kW; 221 hp) at 3,800	510–540 N⋅m (376–398 lb⋅ft) at 1,600–2,800	6.8 – 7.4	RWD & 4WD
E 400 CDI (2003–2005)	4.0 L (3,996 cc; 243.9 cu in) OM628 DE40 V8	260 PS (191 kW; 256 hp) at 4,000	560 N⋅m (413 lb⋅ft) at 1,700-2,600	6.9	RWD
E 420 CDI (2006–2009)	4.0 L (3,996 cc; 243.9 cu in) OM629 DE40 V8	314 PS (231 kW; 310 hp) at 3,600	730 N⋅m (538 lb⋅ft) at 2,200	5.2	RWD

- 2006–2009 E 500 are known as the E 550 in US, Canada.
- E 500 was sold with 5.0L in US, Canada for 2003–2006, and as the E 550 with 5.5L after 2007.
- E 300 BlueTEC was sold as E 320 BlueTEC in US, Canada.
- E 280 4MATIC was sold as E 300 4MATIC in Canada.
- E 240 was sold as E 260 in Indonesia.
- Note that some models (i.e.: E 280, E 350, E 280 CDI) are introduced with the M272 and OM642 engines in pre-facelift form.

=== Transmissions ===
Optional equipment: 5-Speed Automatic – code 42/3 in the data-card; 7-Speed Automatic (7G-TRONIC) – code

2/7 in the data-card; Up to approx. 07/2005:

Model	Standard	Optional
E 200 CDI	6-speed manual	5-speed automatic
E 220 CDI	6-speed manual	5-speed automatic
E 270 CDI	6-speed manual	5-speed automatic
E 280 CDI	5-speed automatic	-
E 320 CDI	5-speed automatic	-
E 400 CDI	5-speed automatic	-
E 200 KOMPRESSOR	6-speed manual	5-speed automatic
E 240	6-speed manual	5-speed automatic
E 240 4MATIC	5-speed automatic	-
E 320	5-speed automatic	-
E 350	7-speed automatic (7G-TRONIC)	-
E 350 4MATIC	5-speed automatic	-
E 500	5-speed automatic	-
E 500 4MATIC	5-speed automatic	-
E 55 AMG	5-speed automatic	-

From 07/2005:

Model	Standard	Optional
E 200 CDI	6-speed manual	5-speed automatic
E 220 CDI	6-speed manual	5-speed automatic
E 280 CDI	6-speed manual	7-speed automatic (7G-TRONIC)
E 280 CDI 4MATIC	5-speed automatic	
E 320 CDI	7-speed automatic (7G-TRONIC)	-
E 320 CDI 4MATIC	5-speed automatic	-
E 200 KOMPRESSOR	6-speed manual	5-speed automatic
E 280	6-speed manual	7-speed automatic (7G-TRONIC)
E 280 4MATIC	5-speed automatic	-
E 350	7-speed automatic (7G-TRONIC)	-
E 350 4MATIC	5-speed automatic	-
E 500	7-speed automatic (7G-TRONIC)	-
E 500 4MATIC	5-speed automatic	-
E 55 AMG	5-speed automatic	-

From 09/2005:

Model	Standard	Optional
E 200 CDI	6-speed manual	5-speed automatic
E 220 CDI	6-speed manual	5-speed automatic
E 280 CDI	6-speed manual	7-speed automatic (7G-TRONIC)
E 280 CDI 4MATIC	5-speed automatic	-
E 320 CDI	7-speed automatic (7G-TRONIC)	-
E 320 CDI 4MATIC	5-speed automatic	-
E 420 CDI	7-speed automatic (7G-TRONIC)	-
E 200 KOMPRESSOR	6-speed manual	5-speed automatic
E 280	6-speed manual	7-speed automatic (7G-TRONIC)
E 280 4MATIC	5-speed automatic	-
E 350	7-speed automatic (7G-TRONIC)	-
E 350 4MATIC	5-speed automatic	-
E 500	7-speed automatic (7G-TRONIC)	-
E 500 4MATIC	5-speed automatic	-
E 55 AMG	5-speed automatic	-

From 01/2006:

Model	Standard	Optional
E 200 CDI	6-speed manual	5-speed automatic
E 220 CDI	6-speed manual	5-speed automatic
E 280 CDI	6-speed manual	7-speed automatic (7G-TRONIC)
E 280 CDI 4MATIC	5-speed automatic	-
E 320 CDI	7-speed automatic (7G-TRONIC)	-
E 320 CDI 4MATIC	5-speed automatic	-
E 420 CDI	7-speed automatic (7G-TRONIC)	-
E 200 KOMPRESSOR	6-speed manual	5-speed automatic
E 280	6-speed manual	7-speed automatic (7G-TRONIC)
E 280 4MATIC	5-speed automatic	-
E 350	7-speed automatic (7G-TRONIC)	-
E 350 4MATIC	5-speed automatic	-
E 500	7-speed automatic (7G-TRONIC)	-
E 500 4MATIC	5-speed automatic	-
E 63 AMG	7-speed automatic (7G-TRONIC)	-

From 09/2007:

Model	Standard	Optional
E 200 CDI	6-speed manual	5-speed automatic
E 220 CDI	6-speed manual	5-speed automatic
E 280 CDI	6-speed manual	7-speed automatic (7G-TRONIC)
E 280 CDI 4MATIC	5-speed automatic	-
E 300 BlueTEC (from 12/2007)	7-speed automatic (7G-TRONIC)	-
E 320 CDI	7-speed automatic (7G-TRONIC)	-
E 320 CDI 4MATIC	5-speed automatic	-
E 420 CDI	7-speed automatic (7G-TRONIC)	-
E 200 KOMPRESSOR	6-speed manual	5-speed automatic
E 200 NGT	5-speed automatic	-
E 230	6-speed manual (up to 09/2007 with 7G-TRONIC)	7-speed automatic (7G-TRONIC, from 09/2007)
E 280	6-speed manual	7-speed automatic (7G-TRONIC)
E 280 4MATIC	5-speed automatic	-
E 350	7-speed automatic (7G-TRONIC)	-
E 350 CGI (from 12/2007)	7-speed automatic (7G-TRONIC)	-
E 350 4MATIC	5-Speed automatic	-
E 550	7-Speed automatic (7G-TRONIC)	-
E 550 4MATIC	5-Speed automatic	-
E 63 AMG	7-speed automatic (7G-TRONIC)	-

From 04/2008: The same, except:

Model	Standard	Optional
E 200 NGT BlueEFFICIENCY	5-speed automatic	-

=== Safety ===
Euro NCAP adult occupant:	5/5 stars
Euro NCAP pedestrian:	1/4 stars
IIHS overall frontal offset score:	Good
IIHS overall side crash test score:	Acceptable

NHTSA crash test ratings (2007):
Frontal Driver:	4/5 stars
Frontal Passenger:	4/5 stars
Side Driver:	4/5 stars
Side Rear Passenger:	5/5 stars
Rollover:	4/5 stars

ANCAP test results Mercedes-Benz E-Class E200 sedan (2001)
Test	Score
Overall	4 /5 stars
Frontal offset	10.36/16
Side impact	13.33/16
Pole	2/2
Seat belt reminders	0/3
Whiplash protection	Not Assessed
Pedestrian protection	Marginal
Electronic stability control	Not Assessed

ANCAP test results Mercedes-Benz E-Class (2002)
Test	Score
Overall	4 /5 stars
Frontal offset	13.26/16
Side impact	15.69/16
Pole	2/2
Seat belt reminders	2/3
Whiplash protection	Not Assessed
Pedestrian protection	Poor
Electronic stability control	Standard

== Sales ==
On 19 December 2008, Mercedes-Benz announced it had delivered 1.5 million units of W211 E-Class vehicles, with 1,270,000 sedans and 230,000 wagons.

US and Germany sales

US Calendar Year	Sales
2003	55,683
2004	58,954
2005	50,383
2006	50,195
2007	48,950
2008	38,576
