= Gyu Hyeong Cho =

South Korean electrical engineer (born 1953)

Gyu Hyeong Cho (Korean: 조규형; Hanja: 曺圭亨; born 1953) is an electrical engineer at the Korea Advanced Institute of Science and Technology (KAIST) in Daejeon, South Korea.

Cho was named a Fellow of the Institute of Electrical and Electronics Engineers (IEEE) in 2016 for his contributions to power management circuit design.
