= Power sequence =

Power sequence may refer to:

- Power sequence (power supplies), power sequencing in power supplies
- Power sequence (matrices), power sequence of a matrix

== See also ==
- Power series
