= Power cycle =

Power cycle may refer to:

- Power cycling, the act of turning a piece of equipment off and then on again
- Thermodynamic power cycle, a linked sequence of thermodynamic processes that forms the basis of an engine
- Duty cycle, the fraction of a period of time in which a signal or system is active

== See also ==
- Cycle (AC current)
