= Power ramp =

In telecommunications, power ramp is the way in which the signal increases ("power-on ramp") or falls off ("power-down ramp"), which may result in spectral splatter.

For example, many GSM front-ends make use of a calibration table specifying the ramp shape for the power amplifier.

== See also ==
- Soft start
- Power gating
- Power sequencing
- Voltage scaling
