= Power Management Unit =

Microcontroller that manages power functions

The Power Management Unit (PMU) is a microcontroller that governs power functions of digital platforms. This microchip has many similar components to the average computer, including firmware and software, memory, a CPU, input/output functions, timers to measure intervals of time, and analog to digital converters to measure the voltages of the main battery or power source of the computer. The PMU is one of the few items to remain active even when the computer is completely shut down, powered by the backup battery.

For portable computers, the PMU is responsible for coordinating many functions, including:

- Monitoring power connections and battery charges
- Charging batteries when necessary
- Controlling power to other integrated circuits
- Shutting down unnecessary system components when they are left idle
- Controlling sleep and power functions (On and Off)
- Managing the interface for built in keypad and touchpads on portable computers
- Regulating the real-time clock (RTC)

== See also ==
- Power management integrated circuit (PMIC)
- System Management Unit (SMU)
- System Management Controller (SMC)
