= Mercedes-Benz OM628 engine =

Diesel engine

Mercedes-Benz OM628
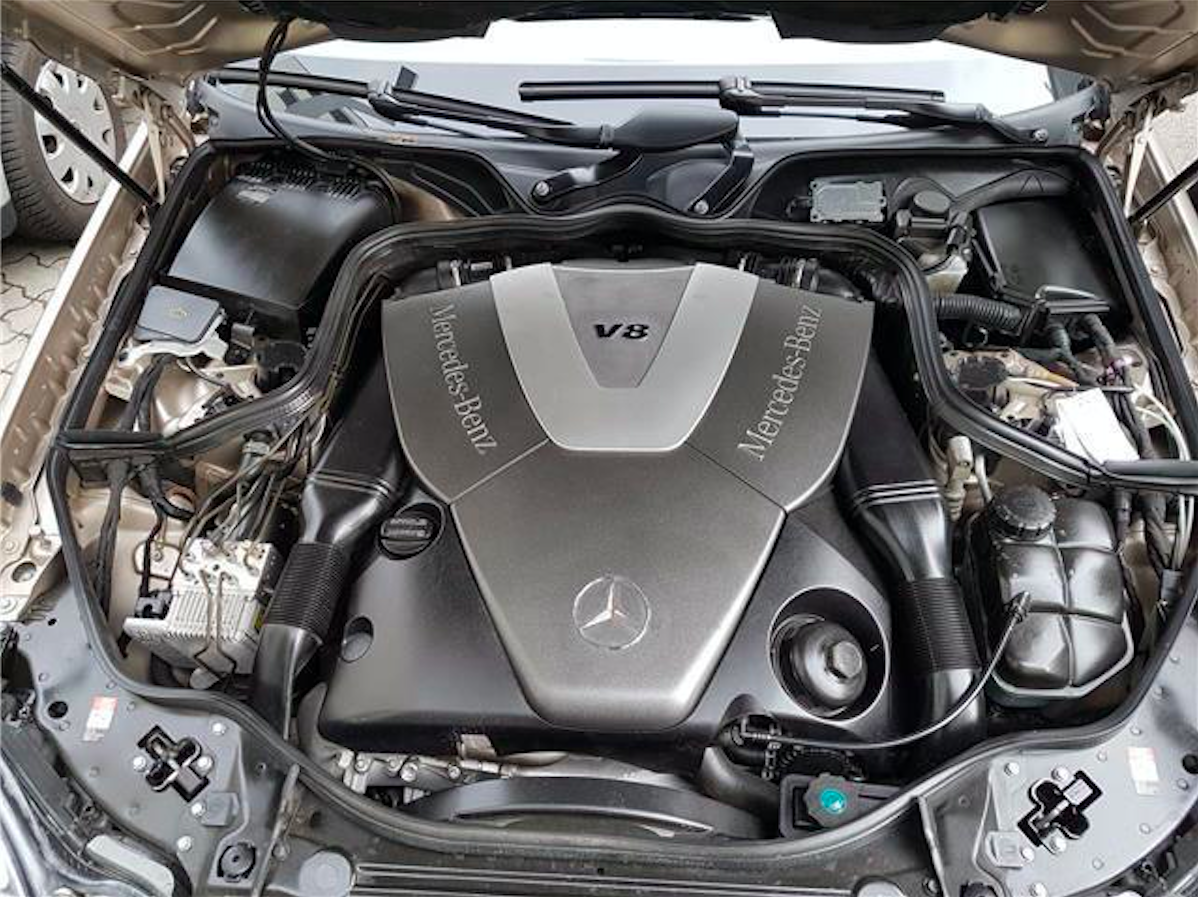

Overview
- Manufacturer: Mercedes-Benz
- Production: 1999–2005

Layout
- Configuration: 75° V8
- Displacement: 4.0 L (3,996 cc)
- Cylinder bore: 86 mm (3.39 in)
- Piston stroke: 86 mm (3.39 in)
- Cylinder block material: Aluminium alloy
- Cylinder head material: Aluminium alloy
- Valvetrain: DOHC 4 valves x cyl.
- Compression ratio: 18.5:1

Combustion
- Turbocharger: Garrett GT1749V
- Fuel system: Common rail
- Fuel type: Diesel
- Cooling system: Water cooled

Output
- Power output: 184–191 kW (250–260 PS; 247–256 hp)
- Torque output: 560 N⋅m (413 lb⋅ft)

Chronology
- Successor: Mercedes-Benz OM629 engine

The Mercedes-Benz OM628 engine is a turbocharged diesel V8 engine produced by Mercedes-Benz, from 1999 to 2005.

== Design ==
The OM628 was created in response to competing V8 diesel engines produced by Audi and BMW. It first appeared in the W220 S400 CDI and was subsequently the first V8 diesel engine in a Mercedes passenger vehicle. The OM628 engine features dual overhead camshafts, 4 valves per cylinder, exhaust gas recirculation, a Garrett GT1749V turbocharger, and Euro 4 emissions compliance. The engine block and cylinder heads are made from an aluminium alloy, via the sand-casting process.

== Models ==
Engine	Power	@ rpm	Torque	@ rpm	Years
OM628; DE40 LA	184 kW (250 PS; 247 hp)	4,000	560 N⋅m (413 lb⋅ft)	1,700–2,600	1999–2005
OM628; DE40 LA	191 kW (260 PS; 256 hp)	4,000	560 N⋅m (413 lb⋅ft)	1,700–2,600	2003–2005

=== OM628 (184 kW version) ===
- 1999–2003 W220 S400 CDI
- 2001–2005 W163 ML400 CDI
- 2001–2005 W463 G400 CDI

=== OM628 (191 kW version) ===
- 2003–2005 W211 E400 CDI
- 2003–2005 W220 S400 CDI
