= Spectral splatter =

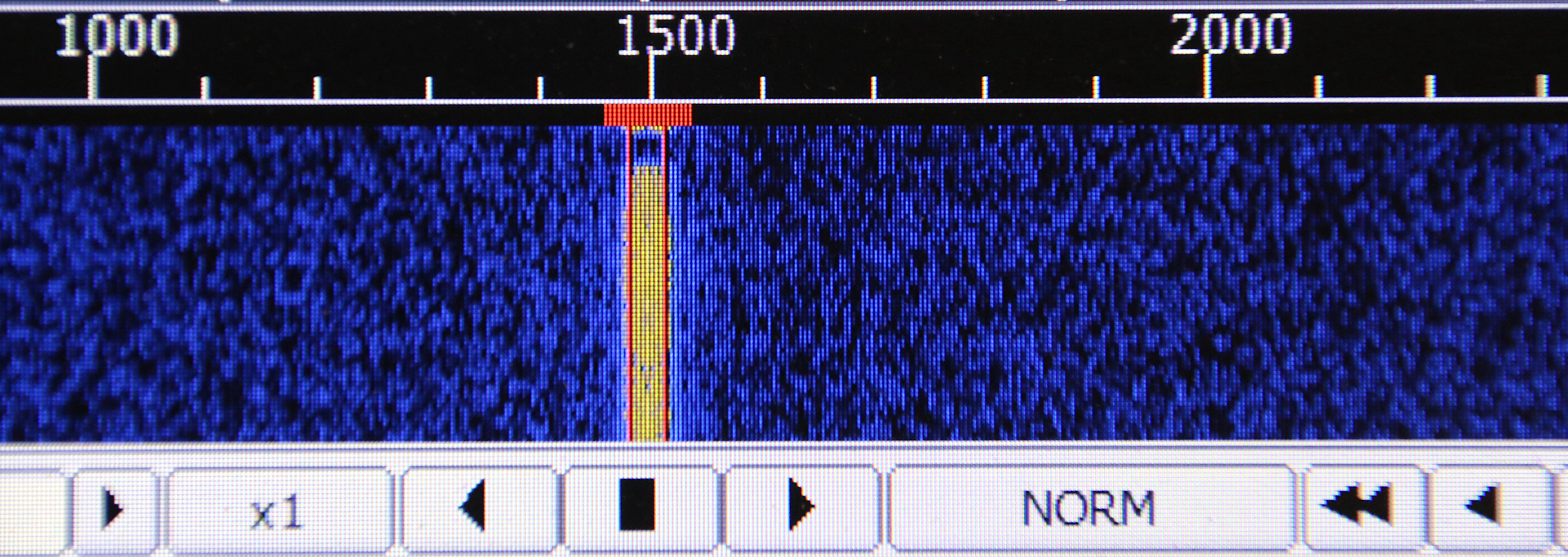
Frequency spectrum of a non-splattering PSK31 signal

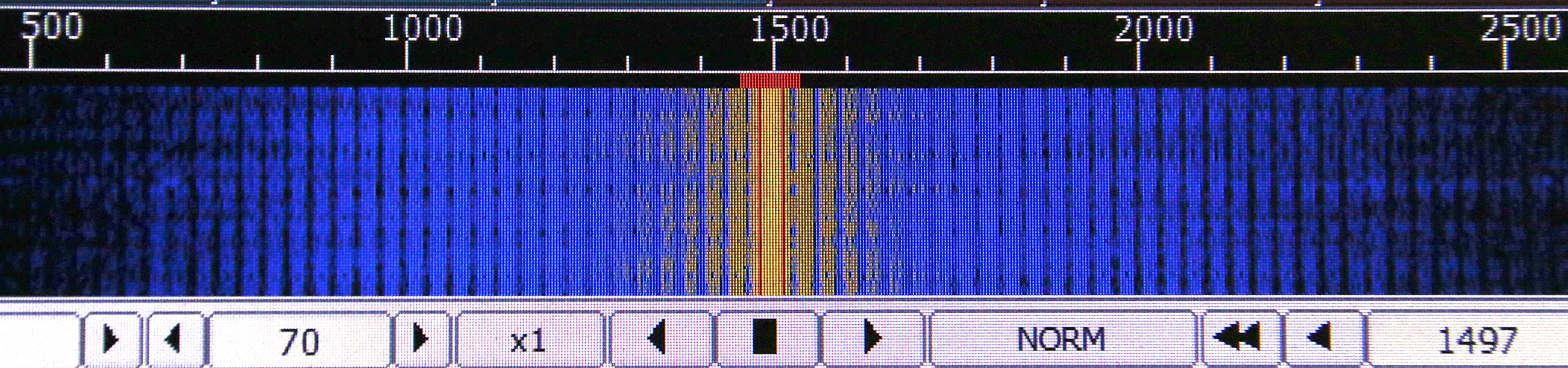
Frequency spectrum of a splattering PSK31 signal

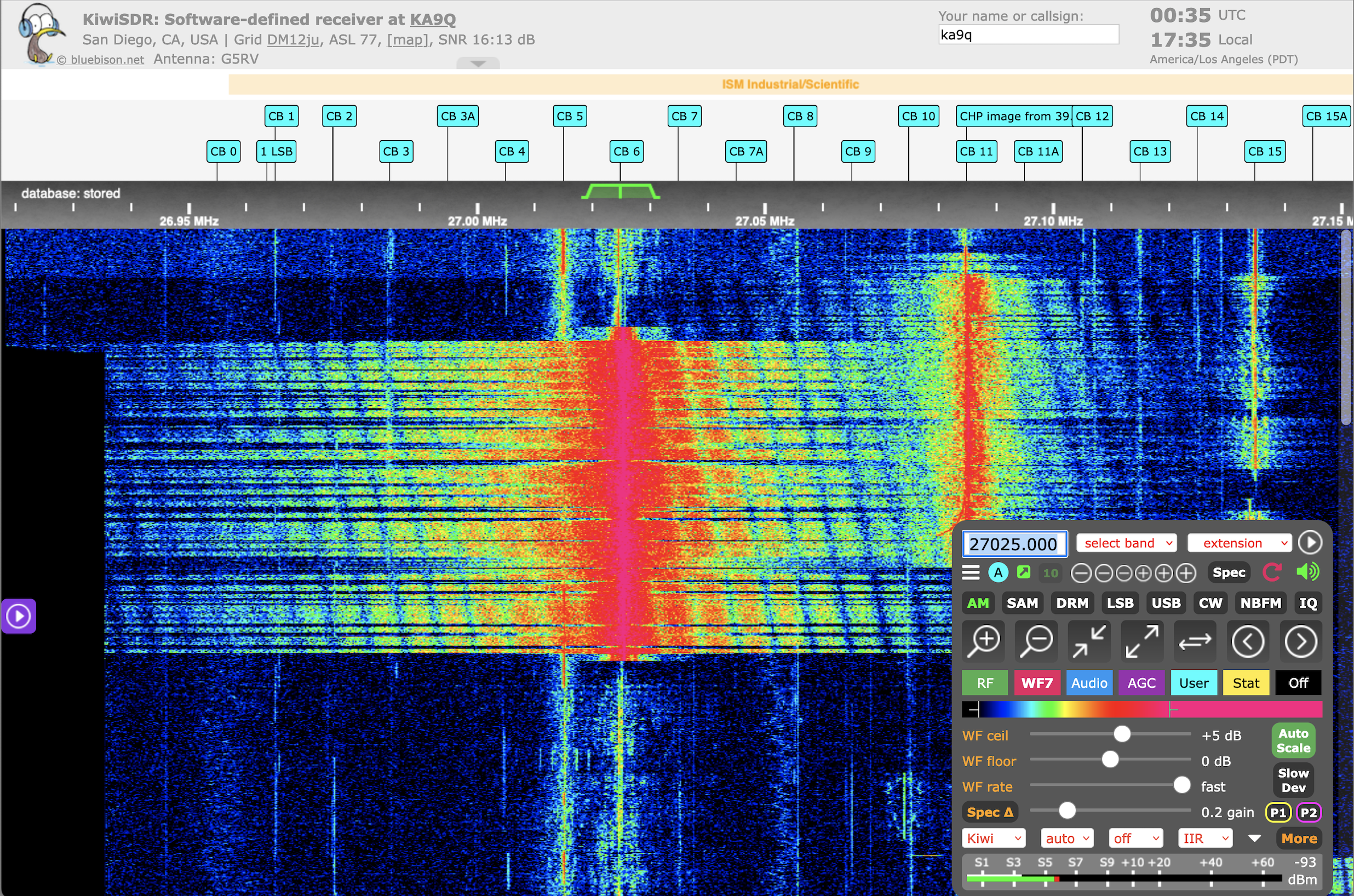
Spectral plot of the 27 MHz band during a band opening showing severely distorted and splattered voice signals

In radio electronics or acoustics, spectral splatter (also called switch noise) refers to spurious emissions that result from an abrupt change in the transmitted signal, usually when transmission is started or stopped.

For example, a device transmitting a sine wave produces a single peak in the frequency spectrum; however, if the device abruptly starts or stops transmitting this sine wave, it will emit noise at frequencies other than the frequency of the sine wave. This noise is known as spectral splatter.

When the signal is represented in the time domain, an abrupt change may not be visually apparent; in the frequency domain, however, the abrupt change causes the appearance of spikes at various frequencies.

A sharper change in the time domain usually results in more spikes or stronger spikes in the frequency domain. Spectral splatter can thus be reduced by making the change more smooth. Controlling the power ramp shape (i.e. the way in which the signal increases ("power-on ramp") or falls off ("power-down ramp")) can help reduce the splatter. In some cases one can use a filter to remove unwanted emissions. Note that a completely abrupt change (in the mathematical sense) is not possible in physical reality; the change is always somewhat smoothed naturally, for example due to the capacitance (in electronics) or inertia (in acoustics) of the components involved.

In radio electronics, the need to minimize spectral splatter arises because signals are usually required by government regulations to be contained in a particular frequency band, defined by a spectral mask. Spectral splatter can cause emissions that violate this mask.

== See also ==
- Gibbs phenomenon
