= Power cycling =

Turning equipment off and then on again

Power cycling is the act of turning a piece of equipment, usually a computer, off and then on again. Reasons for power cycling include having an electronic device reinitialize its set of configuration parameters or recover from an unresponsive state of its mission-critical functionality, such as in a crash or hang situation. Power cycling can also be used to reset network activity inside a modem. It can also be among the first steps for troubleshooting an issue.

== Overview ==
Power cycling can be done manually, usually using the power switch on the device, or remotely, through some type of external device connected to the power input. In some cases a loss of expected activity can automatically cycle the power in an effort to restore normal operation.

In the data center environment, remote control power cycling can usually be done through a power distribution unit, over the network. In the home environment, this can be done through home automation powerline communications. Most Internet service providers publish a "how-to" on their website showing their customers the correct procedure to power cycle their devices.

Power cycling is a common diagnostic procedure usually performed first when a computer system freezes. However, frequently power cycling a computer can cause thermal stress. Reset has an equal effect on the software but may be less problematic for the hardware as power is not interrupted.

== Historical uses ==
On all Apollo missions to the moon, the landing radar was required to acquire the surface before a landing could be attempted. But on Apollo 14, the landing radar was unable to lock on. Mission control told the astronauts to cycle the power. They did, the radar locked on just in time, and the landing was completed.

During the Rosetta mission to comet 67P/Churyumov–Gerasimenko, the Philae lander did not return the expected telemetry on awakening after arrival at the comet. The problem was diagnosed as "somehow a glitch in the electronics", engineers cycled the power, and the lander awoke correctly.

During the launch of the billion dollar AEHF-6 satellite on 26 March 2020 by an Atlas V rocket from Cape Canaveral Space Force Station in Florida, a hold was called at T-46 seconds due to hydraulic system not responding as expected. The launch crew turned it off and back on, and the launch proceeded normally.

In 2023, the Interstellar Boundary Explorer spacecraft stopped responding to commands after an anomaly. When gentler techniques failed, NASA resorted to rebooting the spacecraft with the remote equivalent of a power cycle.

== In popular culture ==
In The IT Crowd, Roy's go-to solution as technical support for company employees is turning their computers off and on again, often suggesting the same solution several times a day.

== See also ==
- Energy conservation
- Power sequencing
- Reboot
