= System Management Controller =

Subsystem of Apple computers

The System Management Controller (SMC) is a subsystem of Intel Macintosh computers and Apple silicon based computers. It is similar in function to the older SMU or PMU of PowerPC based Macintosh computers.

== Overview ==
The SMC has roles in controlling thermal and power management, battery charging, fan control, motion detector, light sensor, sleep and wake, hibernation, and LED indicators. It also enables enforcement of the macOS end-user license, allowing macOS to identify when it is running on non-Apple hardware.

SMC uses ACPI on Intel Macs and RTKIT on Apple silicon based Macs for communication.

== See also ==
- Embedded controller (EC)
- Power management integrated circuit (PMIC)
- Power Management Unit (PMU)
- System Management Unit (SMU)
- Apple T2
