= South Bay Conservatory =

Performing arts organization in Los Angeles

Coordinates: 33.7877°N 118.3542°W

South Bay Conservatory, or SBC, is a non-profit organization started in 1966 with the goal of providing instruction in the performing arts to students residing in the South Bay region of Los Angeles.

== SBC's play formats ==
The Conservatory offers two simultaneous productions. One is for ages 5–12, while the other is for ages 8–18, although there have been exceptions. Since the beginning of these productions, some directors/choreographers/musical directors have come and gone, while others have had a long history with SBC. Currently, Larry Watts is director for the older group's productions, accompanied by Kathleen Sullivan, musical director. Debra Attridge is director of the younger group, with Jodi Rerucha as choreographer, and Jessica Porter as director's assistant.

Performers pay a tuition fee, since they are not only enrolling to perform a play, but to be trained in musical theatre. All who audition are given roles. Also, SBC provides scholarships based on need and merit.
