= Smart Bitrate Control =

Technique for improving video compression efficiency

Smart Bitrate Control (SBC) was a technique for achieving greatly improved video compression efficiency using the DivX 3.11 Alpha video codec or Microsoft's proprietary MPEG-4v2 video codec and the Nandub video encoder. SBC relied on two main technologies to achieve this improved efficiency: multi-pass encoding and Variable Keyframe Intervals (VKI). SBC ceased to be commonly used after XviD and DivX development progressed to a point where they incorporated the same features that SBC pioneered and could offer even more efficient video compression without the need for a specialized application. Files created by SBC are compatible with DivX 3.11 Alpha and can be decoded by most codecs that support International Organization for Standardization (ISO) MPEG4 video.

== Technical details ==
The DivX 3.11 Alpha codec allowed a user to control three aspects of the encoding process: the average bitrate, keyframe interval, and whether the codec preserved smoother motion or more detailed images. DivX attempted to encode an entire movie at an average bitrate the user specified, varying the quality of the video in order to achieve the target bitrate. This meant that a simple section of video, such as a still image, would look very good, but complex video, such as an action scene, would look very bad. DivX's keyframe placement was also very simplistic, it would place keyframes only on the interval that the user selected, every 300 frames (10 seconds at 30 frame/s) by default.

Nandub's multipass encoding encoded the video twice; in the first pass it would analyze the video (and write information to a log file), in the second it would actually produce the output file. Instead of varying the image quality to achieve an average bitrate, this allowed SBC to vary the bitrate to achieve an average quality, using higher bitrate for more complex scenes and lower bitrate for simpler scenes. VKI would place keyframes only where needed, such as at scene changes, rather than at a fixed interval. This significantly improved both the compression efficiency and visual quality of the resulting video. A VKI patch (called the DivX Scene Detect Patch) was also available for DivX to allow for VKI functionality without using Nandub, but it offered inferior performance compared to the VKI algorithms included in Nandub.

Nandub was a modification of the open source VirtualDub video encoder performed by Nando that incorporated SBC features.

== See also ==
- Variable bitrate
