= Cam shedding =

Movement of heald shafts by means of cams

Cam shedding, also known as tappet shedding, is the control of the movement of heald shafts in weaving simple constructions by means of cams or tappets.

In positive cam shedding, the heddle (or heald) shafts are both raised and lowered by the tappets.

In negative cam shedding, the heald shafts are either raised or lowered by the mechanism but are returned by the action of an external device, usually springs. The maximum number of heald shafts controlled by tappet shedding is 20, but this is not possible in practice.

== Bibliography ==
- Textile Terms and Definitions, 11th revised edition, The Textile Institute, 2002. ISBN 978-1870372442
- Principles of Weaving, R. Marks and A.T.C. Robinson, The Textile Institute, 1986. ISBN 978-0900739798
