= System basis chip =

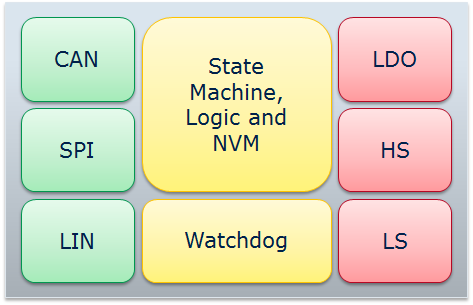
Example partitioning of a system basis chip with bus interfaces (green), central logic (yellow), and outputs (red) for voltage regulators (LDO), high-side, and low-side switches (HS, LS)

A system basis chip (SBC) is an integrated circuit that includes various functions of automotive electronic control units (ECU) on a single die.

It typically includes a mixture of digital standard functionality like communication bus interfaces and analog or power functionality, denoted as smart power. Therefore, SBCs are based on special smart power technology platforms.

The embedded functions may include:

- Voltage regulators
- Supervision functions
- Reset generators,
- Watchdog functions
- Bus interfaces, like Local Interconnect Network (LIN), CAN bus
- Wake-up logic
- Power switches

The complexity range for SBC starts with rather simple hardwired devices to configurable state-machine controlled devices (e.g. through a serial peripheral interface).

Various major automotive semiconductor manufacturers offer SBCs.
