= Sensotronic Brake Control =

Electro-hydraulic braking system

Sensotronic Brake Control (SBC) is an electro-hydraulic brake system developed by Daimler and Bosch. In this system, the wheel brake cylinders of a vehicle are operated through a servomechanism, offering precise and responsive braking.

The SBC system was first introduced on the R230 SL-class, which was released in Europe in October 2001.

== Mechanics ==
The Sensotronic Brake Control (SBC) system operates using a hydraulic high-pressure reservoir to supply brake fluid. A piston pump, driven by an electric motor, generates controlled brake fluid pressure ranging between 140 bars (2,000 psi) and 160 bars (2,300 psi) in the gas diaphragm reservoir.

When the brakes are engaged, the SBC control unit calculates the necessary brake pressure for each wheel individually. This is achieved using four independent pressure modulators, each consisting of an inlet and an outlet valve controlled electronically.

The system includes a travel sensor and a pressure sensor at the brake pedal to measure the speed and force of the pedal application. The control unit processes these inputs and sends appropriate control signals to the wheel pressure modulators. Typically, the master brake cylinder is disconnected from the brake circuit, with a pedal travel simulator providing normal pedal feedback. In situations where the Electronic Stability Program (ESP) is activated, the high-pressure reservoir quickly delivers the required brake pressure to specific wheels with precision.

== Advantages and disadvantages ==
The Sensotronic Brake Control (SBC) system allows for precise control of brake pressure at each wheel, enabling the use of stability control methods such as Anti-lock Braking System (ABS) and Electronic Stability Program (ESP). On some vehicles, the system incorporates features designed to enhance driver convenience, including:

- Traffic Jam Assist: Automatically brakes the vehicle in stop-and-go traffic when the driver releases the accelerator.
- Soft-Stop Function: Provides smoother stops in city traffic by modulating braking pressure.

In the event of a computer malfunction, SBC defaults to a conventional hydraulic master cylinder, which may require increased driver effort and result in longer stopping distances. Additionally, if the pump fails, the high-pressure reservoir retains sufficient pressure to allow for electronic braking.

== Industry recognition ==
In 2001, the μ-Club, an international association of brake technology experts, recognized Robert Bosch and Daimler Chrysler for their development of the electrohydraulic brake system, SBC.

== Problems ==
In May 2004, Mercedes-Benz issued a recall for 680,000 vehicles equipped with the Sensotronic Brake Control (SBC) system, followed by a further recall of 1.3 million vehicles in March 2005. By 2006, high-volume models like the E-Class were transitioned back to conventional hydraulic braking systems, while low-volume luxury models such as the SL, Maybach, and SLR continued to use SBC due to the high cost of redesigning the brake system.

In August 2018, Mercedes-Benz USA extended the warranty on SBC components out to 25 years from the warranty's original start date with no mileage limit. The warranty covers the following parts:

- Hydraulic Control Unit
- Hydraulic Pump
- Pressure Reservoir
- Brake Operating Unit
- Front and Rear Wheel Speed Sensors
- Brake Lamp Switch
- Yaw Rate Sensor

== Sensotronic Brake Control applications ==
- 2003–2006 E-Class (W211)
- SLR
- Maybach
- 2003–2006 Mercedes-Benz CLS-Class (W219)
- 2001–2011 SL-Class

== Other production electro-hydraulic brake systems ==
- Toyota Prius (Introduced in 1997; uses an ehb system from Advics)
- Toyota Estima Hybrid (Introduced in 2001 in Japan)
- Ford Escape Hybrid (Introduced in 2003)
- Acura NSX, 2nd generation (Introduced in 2015)
- Audi e-tron (Introduced in 2018)
