= Power sequencing =

Example power-up sequencing of three voltage sources

In electronic circuits that have multiple power supplies, power sequencing is the process of turning power supplies on or off in a particular order and in accordance with specific timing constraints, for the purpose of preventing conditions that could damage circuitry or cause improper operation.

In practice, a variety of methods are commonly used to control power sequencing. Such methods may incorporate fixed time delays, or use feedback from power supplies, or both to control power sequencing. Some power sequence controllers have fixed functionality, and others are programmable.

== Applications ==
Many integrated circuits (ICs) and electronic systems have multiple power rails, meaning that they are powered by multiple voltage sources. For example, mixed signal ICs usually require separate power supplies for analog and digital circuitry, and may also have a separate power rail for digital I/O pins. Complex devices such as SOC and FPGA ICs usually require power from several voltage sources, with the latter sometimes having as many as ten or more rails. Electronic systems such as servers and industrial equipment also typically have multiple power rails.

== Purpose ==
In multi-rail circuits, the rail voltages often must be applied or removed, or both, in a particular order to avoid circuit damage and abnormal operation. For example, incorrect power sequencing can trigger latch-ups that disrupt normal circuit operation and allow potentially destructive, high currents to flow. Improper sequencing can also cause ESD and input protection diodes to become forward-biased, resulting in abnormal current flows and interference with the startup operation of one or more power rails.

Without power-up sequencing, multiple rails may simultaneously ramp up their voltages and, in the process, draw high inrush current from their common power source, causing it to limit its output current. This in turn can cause the rail voltages to fluctuate and plateau or become non-monotonic as they start up, resulting in unpredictable power sequencing and possibly preventing the rails from reaching their required voltages. In addition to circuit damage and reduced lifespan, incorrect power sequencing can cause initialization errors, invalid logic states and unstable operation.

== Implementation ==
Various methods are used to implement power sequencing, but in general, the rails are energized or de-energized by enabling or disabling their associated voltage regulators, or by passing or blocking the regulator outputs with switching devices, in a predetermined order with controlled delays between the rail activations and deactivations.

A control mechanism for power sequencing may employ feedback or it may run open loop. Some controllers monitor the rail voltages and enable or disable dependent rails when specific voltage thresholds have been reached. In contrast, some other controllers impose fixed time delays between successive rail activations and deactivations, turning dependent rails on or off without monitoring or considering the states of other rails. More complex controllers, which are often programmable, monitor the rail voltages and switch dependent rails on or off based on the states of other rails as well as time delays.

=== Ramp rate ===
When a rail is activated or deactivated, the voltage will ramp (rise or fall) at a rate that is determined by various factors, including the voltage source's peak output current, the impedance of the circuit it is powering (the load), and any residual voltage present on the rail. These factors typically differ from one rail to another, and consequently the voltage ramp rates (slew rates) of the rails also are usually different.

Power sequencing must account for differences between the voltage ramp rates of the rails while they are powering up or down, because such differences can effectively alter the power sequence. For example, consider a system with two power rails, V_{CC1} and V_{CC2}, in which the V_{CC1} voltage is required to always be higher than V_{CC2}. If V_{CC2} has a faster ramp-up rate than V_{CC1}, a sequence timing violation can occur even if V_{CC1} is turned on before V_{CC2}, as shown below. A commonly used method for avoiding this is to monitor V_{CC1} and, upon V_{CC1} reaching a level that exceeds the V_{CC2} target voltage, turn on V_{CC2}.

Power sequence timing violation due to different ramp rates. V_{CC2} is turned on after V_{CC1}, but its faster ramp rate causes it to briefly exceed V_{CC1}.

Correct sequencing for supplies with different ramp rates

=== Daisy-chained regulators ===
Many voltage regulators provide an enable (EN) input signal and a power good (PG) output signal that can be used to facilitate power-up sequencing. Such regulators are commonly connected in a daisy-chain so that the PG output of each regulator drives the EN input of the next regulator in the chain, as shown below.

Simplified schematic diagram of three daisy-chained voltage regulators. Each regulator, upon reaching its target output voltage, asserts its PG output, thus enabling the next regulator in the chain.

Timing diagram showing power-up sequencing of three daisy-chained regulators

Each regulator is turned on when its EN input exceeds a specific threshold voltage. When its output voltage has ramped up to its target voltage range, a regulator will assert its PG output, which in turn enables the next regulator in the chain. When the last regulator in the chain reaches its target voltage range, it activates its PG output and thus indicates power sequencing has completed and all rails are operating at their target voltages.

Daisy-chained regulators provide a cost-effective and simple method for controlling power-up sequencing, but generally do not support power-down sequencing.

== See also ==
- PMIC, power management integrated circuit
