= Control-Alt-Delete =

Computer keyboard shortcut that triggers a reboot or system security function

A QWERTY keyboard layout with the position of Control, Alt and Delete keys highlighted

Control-Alt-Delete (often abbreviated to Ctrl+Alt+Del and sometimes called the "three-finger salute" or "Security Keys") is a computer keyboard command on IBM PC compatible computers, invoked by pressing the Delete key while holding the Control and Alt keys: Ctrl+Alt+Delete. The function of the key combination differs depending on the context but it generally interrupts or facilitates interrupting a function. For instance, in pre-boot environment (before an operating system starts) or in MS-DOS, Windows 3.0 and earlier versions of Windows or OS/2, the key combination reboots the computer. Starting with Windows 95, the key combination invokes a task manager or security related component that facilitates ending a Windows session or killing a frozen application.

== History ==
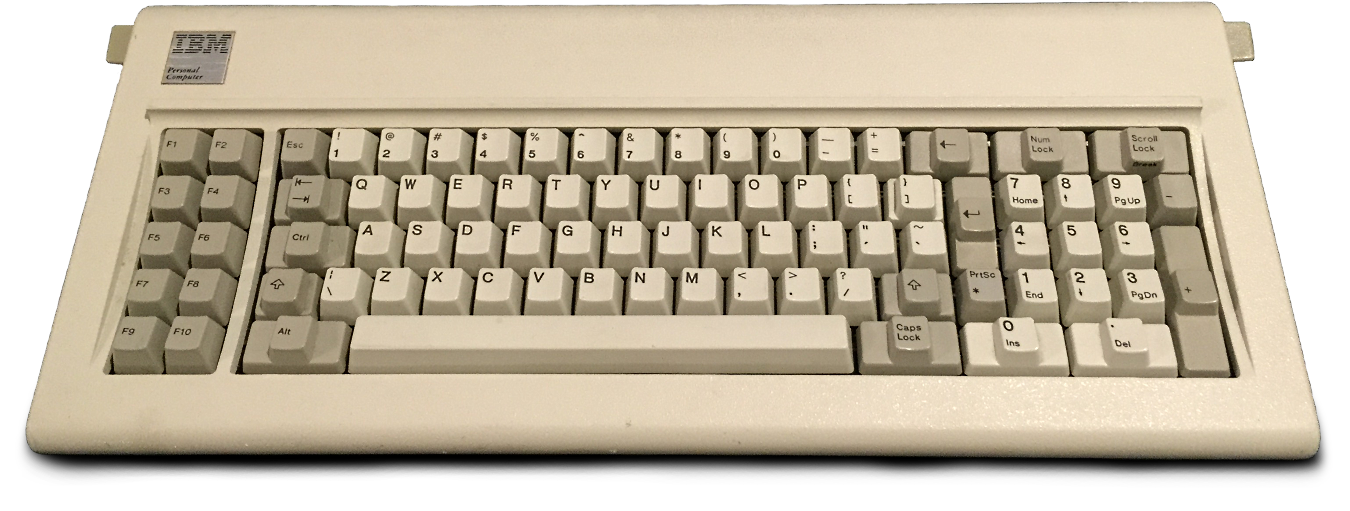
Original IBM PC 5150 keyboard: It is very difficult to press Ctrl+Alt+Del with one hand only

The soft reboot function via keyboard was originally designed by David Bradley. Bradley, as the chief engineer of the IBM PC project and developer of the machine's ROM-BIOS, had originally used Ctrl+Alt+Esc, but found it was too easy to bump the left side of the keyboard and reboot the computer accidentally. According to his own account, Mel Hallerman, who was the chief programmer of the project, therefore suggested switching the key combination to Ctrl+Alt+Delete as a safety measure, a combination impossible to press with just one hand on the original IBM PC keyboard.

The feature was originally conceived only as a development feature for internal use and not intended to be used by end users, as it triggered the reboot without warning or further confirmation—it was meant to be used by people writing programs or documentation so that they could reboot their computers without powering them down. Bill Gates (former Microsoft CEO) remembered it as "just something we were using in development and it wouldn't be available elsewhere". The feature, however, was detailed in IBM's technical reference documentation to the original PC and thereby revealed to the general public.

Bradley viewed this work as just one small task out of many: "It was five minutes, 10 minutes of activity, and then I moved on to the next of the 100 things that needed to get done." In a March 2018 email, one of Bradley's co-workers confirmed the command was invented in 1981 in Boca Raton, Florida.

Bradley is also known for his good-natured jab at Gates at the celebration of the 20th anniversary of the IBM PC on August 8, 2001 at The Tech Museum: "I have to share the credit. I may have invented it, but I think Bill made it famous."; he quickly added it was a reference to Windows NT logon procedures ("Press Ctrl + Alt + Delete to log on").

During a question and answer presentation on 21 September 2013, Gates said "it was a mistake", referring to the decision to use Ctrl+Alt+Del as the keyboard combination to log into Windows. Gates stated he would have preferred a single button to trigger the same actions, but could not get IBM to add the extra button into the keyboard layout.

== BIOS ==
By default, when the operating system is running in real mode (or in a pre-boot environment, when no operating system is started yet), this keystroke combination is intercepted by the BIOS. The BIOS reacts by performing a soft reboot (also known as a warm reboot). Examples of such operating systems include DOS, Windows 3.0 in Standard Mode as well as earlier versions of Windows.

== Windows ==
=== DOS-based Windows ===
Close Program dialog box, seen in Windows 9x

In Windows 9x and Windows 3.0 running in 386 Enhanced mode, the keystroke combination is recognized by the Windows keyboard device driver. According to the value of the LocalReboot option in the [386Enh] section of system.ini, Windows performs one of several actions in response. If LocalReboot=On (default):

- Windows 3.1x displays a blue screen that allows the user to press Enter to end a task that has stopped responding to the system (if such a task exists) or press Control+Alt+Delete again to perform a soft reboot. The text of this rudimentary task manager was written by Steve Ballmer.
- Windows 9x temporarily halts the entire system and displays the Close Program dialog box, a window which lists currently running processes and allows the user to end them (by force, if necessary). The user can press Control+Alt+Delete again to perform a soft reboot.

If LocalReboot=Off, Windows performs a soft reboot.

=== Windows NT family ===
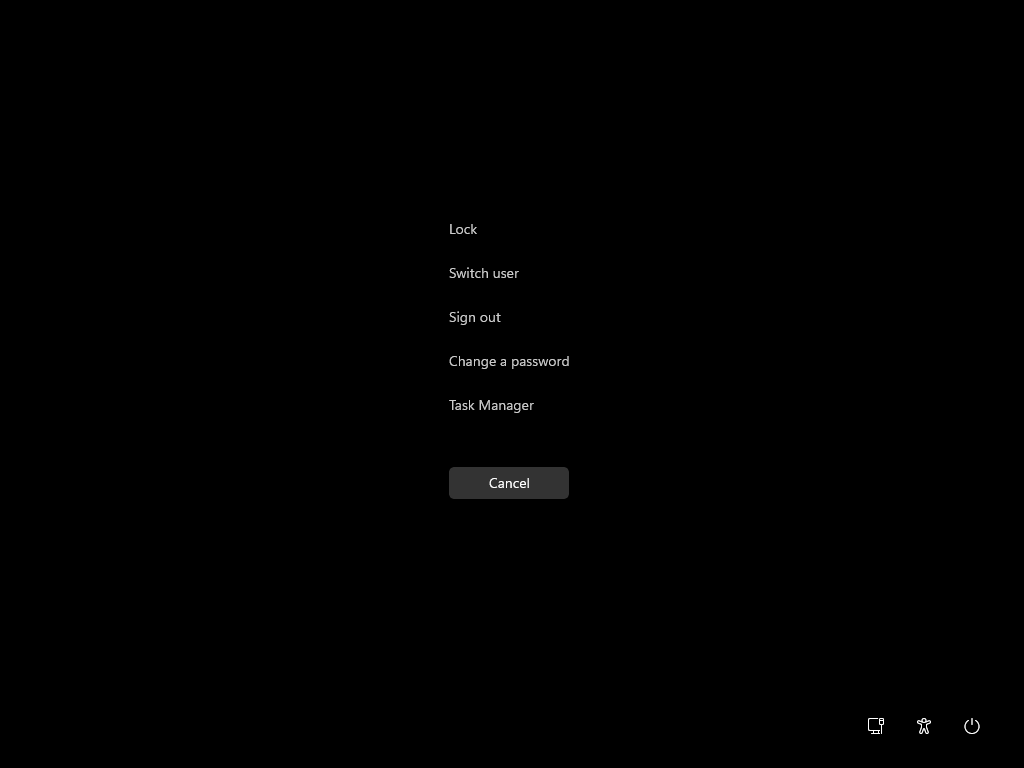
The Windows Security screen in Windows 11 provides various security-related options.

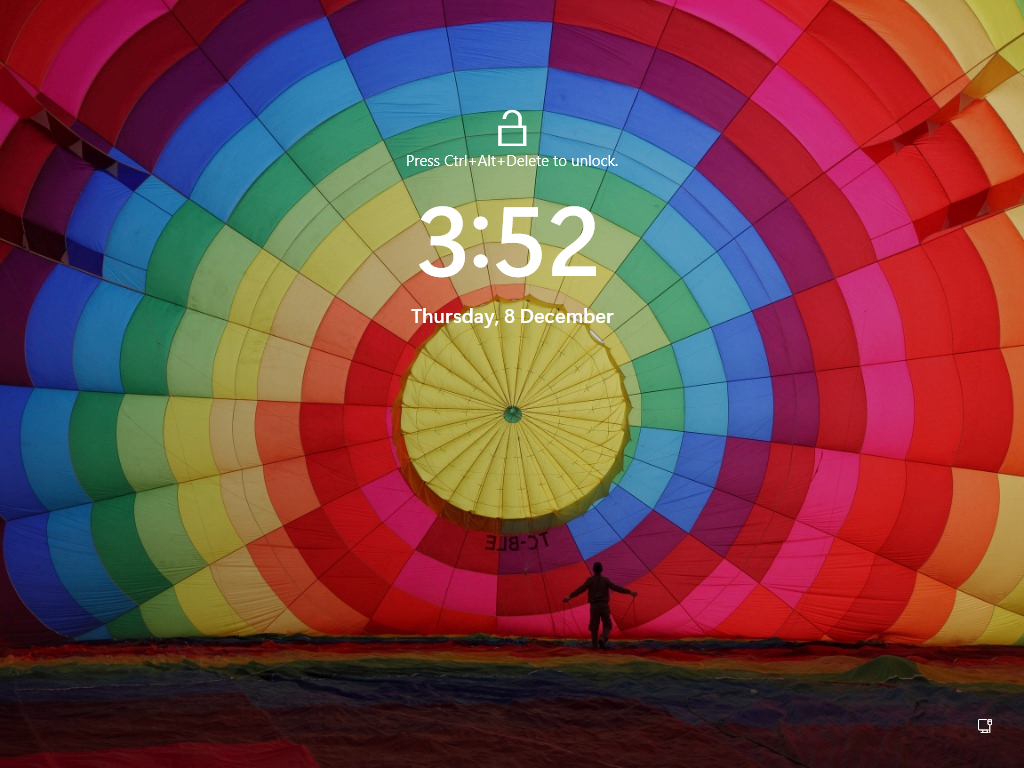
Windows 11 secure attention screen

The UAC for Windows 11, where the user is required to press Ctrl-Alt-Delete first to enter credentials, as a part of avoiding login spoofing

The Windows NT family of operating system, whose members do not have "NT" in their names since Windows 2000, reserve Ctrl+Alt+Delete for the operating system itself. Winlogon, a core component of the operating system, responds to the key combination in the following scenarios:

Invoking Windows Security
When a user is logged onto a Windows computer, pressing Ctrl+Alt+Delete invokes Windows Security. It is a graphical user interface that allows user to lock the system, (Note: When a Windows computer is locked, access to Windows is only allowed when valid credentials are supplied. Unlocking a computer is similar to a logon.) switch user, log off, change the password, invoke Windows Task Manager, or end the Windows session by shutting down, rebooting or putting the computer into sleep or hibernation; clicking "Cancel" or pressing the Escape key returns the user to where they were.

The key combination always invokes Windows Security in all versions and editions of Windows NT family except Windows XP. (See below.) Prior to Windows Vista, Windows Security was a dialog box, did not allow user switching and showed the logon date and time, name of user account into which the user has logged on and the computer name. Starting with Windows Vista, Windows Security became full-screen.

Secure attention
Login spoofing is a social engineering trick in which a malicious computer program with the appearance of a Windows login dialog box prompts for user's account name and password to steal them. To thwart this attack, Windows NT implements an optional security measure in which Ctrl+Alt+Delete acts as a secure attention key combination. Once the protection is activated, Windows requires the user to press Ctrl+Alt+Delete each time before logging on or unlocking the computer. Since the key combination is intercepted by Windows itself and malicious software cannot mimic this behavior, (Note: The only way to wrest the control of Ctrl+Alt+Delete handling from Windows is to subvert its core components such as kernel or winlogon. However, a malicious program that has succeeded in breaching Windows integrity so deeply does not need to steal a password.) the trick is thwarted. Unless the Windows computer is part of a Windows domain network, the secure attention protection is disabled by default and must be enabled by the user.

Windows XP behavior
Windows XP introduces Welcome Screen, a redesigned logon interface. The Welcome Screen of Windows XP, however, does not support the secure attention scenario. It may be disabled in favor of the classic plain logon screen, either explicitly by the user or as a consequence of the Windows XP computer becoming part of a Windows domain network. With that in mind, Windows XP uses the Ctrl+Alt+Delete in the following unique scenarios:

1. At a logon prompt, the key combination dismisses Welcome Screen and invokes classic logon user interface.
2. When a user is logged on to a Windows XP computer and Welcome Screen is enabled, pressing the key combination invokes Windows Task Manager instead of Windows Security.

Windows Vista and the next versions of Windows NT did not inherit any of the above.

== OS/2 ==
In OS/2, this keystroke combination is recognized by the OS/2 keyboard device driver, which notifies the session manager process. The normal session manager process in OS/2 versions 2.0 and later is the parent Workplace Shell process, which displays the "system is rebooting" window and triggers a soft reboot. If it is pressed twice in succession OS/2 triggers an immediate soft reboot, without waiting for the session manager process.

In both cases, the system flushes the page cache, cleanly unmounts all disc volumes, but does not cleanly shut down any running programs (and thus does not save any unsaved documents, or the current arrangements of the objects on the Workplace Shell desktop or in any of its open folders).

== Mac ==
Ctrl+Alt+Delete is not a keyboard shortcut on macOS. Instead, ⌘ Command+⌥ Option+Esc brings up the Force Quit panel. Control+⌘ Command+Power restarts the computer.

The original Mac OS X Server had an Easter egg in which pressing Control+⌥ Option+Delete (as the Option key is the equivalent of Alt key on a Mac keyboard) would show an alert saying "This is not DOS!".

== Linux ==
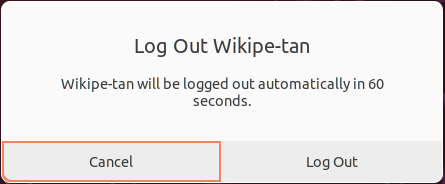
The result of pressing the key combination in Ubuntu v22.10

In the GNOME desktop environment for Linux, Control+Alt+Delete is a shortcut for logging out.

On Ubuntu Server, it is used to reboot a computer without logging in.

== Equivalents on various platforms ==
Desktop operating systems
Platform	Key combination	Function
Amiga	Ctrl+Left Amiga+Right Amiga	Perform a hardware reboot by sending a reset signal to system via keyboard MCU (+ possible extra keycode + max 10s delay if "reset warning" is supported and in use).
BIOS	Ctrl+Alt+Delete	Perform a soft reboot without memory initialization by jumping to IPL reset vector, after broadcasting a pending shutdown event (on AT compatible machines).
DOS + KEYB	Ctrl+Alt+Delete	Perform a soft reboot without memory initialization by jumping to IPL reset vector, after broadcasting a pending shutdown event (on AT compatible machines) and flushing disk caches (since DOS 6, or with FreeKEYB loaded). Some 386 memory managers (e.g. QEMM) can intercept and turn this into a quick reboot. If more than one task is running under multitaskers like DR-DOS EMM386 /MULTI + TASKMGR, this will only kill the currently running foreground task.
DOS + K3PLUS or FreeKEYB	⇧ Shift+Ctrl+Alt+Delete	Perform a soft reboot with memory initialization (aka "cold reboot") by jumping to IPL reset vector, after broadcasting a pending shutdown event (on AT compatible machines) and flushing disk caches.
DOS + K3PLUS or FreeKEYB	LShift+RShift+Ctrl+Alt+Delete	Perform a hard reboot by triggering the chipset's reset logic, after broadcasting a pending shutdown event and flushing disk caches.
Windows 3.x	Ctrl+Alt+Delete	Close unresponsive applications. Performs a soft reboot if pressed twice.
Windows 9x	Ctrl+Alt+Delete	Bring up "Close Program" dialog box (a simplistic task manager). Performs a soft reboot if pressed twice.
Windows NT family	Ctrl+⇧ Shift+Esc	Bring up the Windows Task Manager
Windows NT family	Ctrl+Alt+Delete	Before logon: Brings up the login screen (secure attention sequence); After logon: Brings up Windows Security; in Windows XP, brings up Windows Task Manager if the welcome screen is enabled, otherwise brings up Windows Security
Windows NT family	Ctrl+Alt+End	Used in Terminal Services to send the command to the remote session / application: Before logon (when not using Network Level Authentication): Brings up the login screen (secure attention sequence); After logon: Brings up Windows Security
Windows NT family	Ctrl, ScrollLock (twice)	Causes a user-initiated crash (disabled by default; must be enabled with registry editing) An equivalent function is Ctrl+NumLock (with Ctrl held down and pressing NumLock twice)
OS/2	Ctrl+Esc	Bring up the Window List (unblocking the synchronous input queue)
OS/2	Ctrl+Alt+Delete	Perform a soft reboot
OS/2	Ctrl+Alt, NumLock (twice)	Halt the system and begin a system dump to floppy disk
TOS (1.4 and higher), MiNT	Ctrl+Alt+Delete	Perform soft reboot without memory initialization (warm boot)
TOS (1.4 and higher), MiNT	RShift+Ctrl+Alt+Delete	Perform soft reboot with memory initialization (cold boot)
Linux	Ctrl+Alt+Delete	Signal the init process (usually configured to soft reboot)
Linux	Alt+SysRq+function key	Magic SysRq key: Depending on the function key, performs a certain low-level function. Examples: sync (flush caches), reboot (forced soft reboot), unmount (remount filesystems readonly), etc.
macOS	⌥ Option+⌘ Command+Esc	Force quit applications
macOS	⌘ Cmd+⌃ Control+⏏ Media Eject	Quit all applications and restart
macOS	⌘ Cmd+⌥ Option+⌃ Control+⏏ Media Eject	Quit all applications and shut down
macOS	Control+⏏ Media Eject	Show restart, sleep or shutdown dialog
macOS	Control+⌘ Command+Power	Immediately restarts computer.
BeOS	Ctrl+Alt+⇧ Shift and click an application's entry in the Deskbar	Kills application
Xfce	Ctrl+Alt+Esc + click on window	Kills application (invokes xkill)
Xfce	Ctrl+Alt+Delete	Lock the screen and invoke the screensaver
X Window System	Ctrl+Alt+← Backspace	Immediately kills the X server (the key combination can be disabled). When using an X Display Manager, it will usually start the X server again.
BBC Micro running Acorn MOS	1. Break; 2. Control+Break; 3. ⇧ Shift+Break	1. Soft boot 2. Hard boot 3. Soft boot and look for any bootable media on the active filesystem
Amstrad PCW on CP/M	⇧ Shift+Extra+Exit	

Other platforms
Platform	Key combination	Function
TI-30XIIS	On+Clear	Restarts the calculator and clears RAM
TI-80, TI-81, TI-82, TI-83, TI-84	Mode, Alpha, S	Shows ROM version number. [Enter] enters self test mode
TI-85, TI-86	2nd, Mode, Alpha, S	Shows ROM version number. [Enter] enters self test mode
TI-89	2nd+←+→+On	Restarts the calculator and clears RAM
TI-89	Esc+On	Force break without restarting RAM
TI-89	F5, ◆+Clear, Alpha+S	Enter self test mode
Natural display Casio calculators	⇧ Shift+7+On	Restarts the calculator and clears RAM and EEPROM. Continue pressing Shift to advance through self-test mode.
TI-99/4A	FCTN+=	Resets machine back to startup screen.
Voyage 200	2nd+Hand+On	Restarts the calculator and clears RAM
HP-48	On+C	Restarts RPL, clearing the Stack and PICT, closing IO, and returning to the HOME directory (but not purging the memory)
HP-48	On+A+F	As above, but also purges the memory
Scientific Atlanta Explorer DHCT; Samsung cable boxes	Volume Down+Volume Up+Info (on settop box; not remote)	Reboots box
Foxtel Set-top-boxes	Back+Select (on box; except UEC 720)	Power cycles the machine.
Foxtel Set-top-boxes	Standby+Foxtel (on box; UEC 720)	Power cycles the machine.
Foxtel Set-top-boxes	Back+Select+Reset (on box; iQ2)	Power cycles the machine.
C64	Run/Stop+Restore	Warm starts the machine, does not work if CPU has crashed or NMI is blocked in hardware or rerouted.
Amazon Fire TV	Select+Play/Pause (on remote)	Reboots the device

Virtual machine platforms
Platform	Key combination	Function
VMware	Ctrl+Alt+Insert	Send the command to the virtual machine.
Microsoft Virtual PC	RAlt+Delete	Send the command to the virtual machine.
Windows Virtual PC for Windows 7	Ctrl+Alt+End	Send the command to the virtual machine.
Oracle VM VirtualBox	Host+Delete	Send the command to the virtual machine.

== Cultural adoption ==
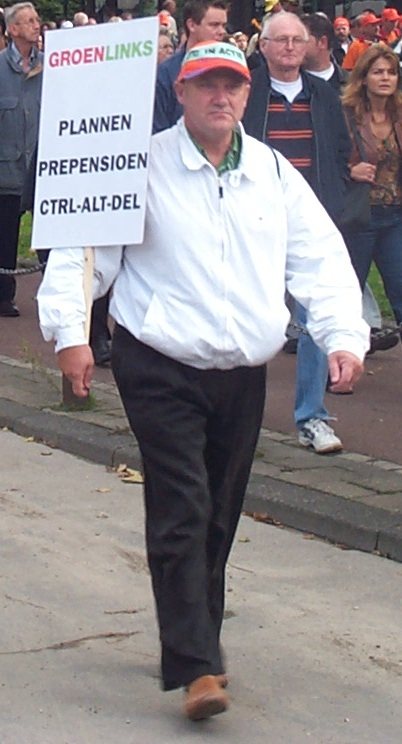
Dutch protester carrying a sign that reads "Ctrl-Alt-Del the early retirement plan"

As computers became ubiquitous, so too, has the jargon. Control-Alt-Delete can also mean "dump," or "do away with".

The keystrokes are well known and infamous for escaping from problems in pop culture. For example, in the Billy Talent song "Perfect World", part of the lyrics include the sequence and associate it with resetting their memory and escaping from a situation: "Control-Alt-Deleted. Reset my memory."

== See also ==
- Table of keyboard shortcuts
