= Iken.in =

Indian collaborative learning website

iKen
- Website type: Content Sharing & Social Networking Service for Learning
- Creator: Mexus Education
- Website: https://www.iken.in
- Commercial: Yes
- Launched: 16 April 2008
- Current status: Active

iKen.in is an interactive knowledge sharing & social networking site, built on a collaborative learning model. The website was built keeping in mind the specific needs and dynamics involved in a learning process. Its participatory learning model helps users to share content and connect with peers. Apart from User Generated Content, UGC, users can also learn by taking tests available on the website which are customized for each standard (grade) in the K-12 segment. Also, Iken.in has a play section that features educational interactive games.

== History ==
iKen is the brand of Mexus Education Private Limited. iKen is prominently known for its presence in schools for providing e-learning applications, Preschool curriculum and STEM education offerings.

Over a period of time Iken.in has now evolved as a platform for connecting Schools - Students - Parents - Educators through iKen App and web platform.

== Website ==
Iken.in primarily is a knowledge sharing website with a social networking feature. The course curriculum multimedia content available on Iken.in is developed by Mexus Education while users contribute by uploading content created by them adding to a repository of education oriented UGC.

The website is primarily targeted at the K-12 segment, in line with related course material developed by Mexus Education under the iKen Books & iKen Library brand. On login, users define themselves as students or professionals. Students or learners can access course curriculum content specifically designed for their respective standards or grade. Professionals can participate and share knowledge & experience in their field of expertise.

Although the website was designed keeping in mind the demands of a school based curriculum, the definition of a student & professional could be extended to a ‘learner’ and a ‘teacher’. This provides enough scope for users on Iken.in across various age groups to learn from peers and also from other participants who could share their knowledge like school & college teachers, Graduate & B-school students, professionals working in different industries & sectors, parents, individuals employed in corporate businesses or non-governmental organizations (NGOs), etc.

The website is developed around key sections Share, Connect, Learn, Test and Play. The ‘Connect’ section allows users to connect with peers & virtual mentors. The ‘Learn’ section on iKen consists of curriculum oriented content developed by iKen which can be customized by users to meet their specific requirements. The ‘Test’ feature allows users to test their level of knowledge and provides a real time performance assessment personalized manner. The ‘Share’ section allows users to create multimedia content with others in the form of videos, presentations, documents, etc. Users receive constructive feedback from peers & other participants. The ‘Play’ on iKen consists of learning oriented educational games which help students learn.

== See also ==
- E-Learning
- Virtual education
- Multimedia
