= Port 80 =

Port 80 may refer to:

- TCP port 80, most often used by Hypertext Transfer Protocol
- I/O port 80 in IBM PCs, used by POST error reporting

Port 80 is the default port used for HTTP (HyperText Transfer Protocol). When you visit a website that starts with http://, your browser connects to the server on port 80 to request and receive web pages.

Port 80 sends data without encryption, which is why most modern websites now use port 443 (HTTPS) instead, which is secure.

In short: Port 80 = standard, unencrypted web traffic (HTTP).
