= Secure attention key =

Special key combination

A secure attention key (SAK), special attention key, or secure attention sequence (SAS) is a special key, key combination or sequence to be pressed on a computer keyboard before a login screen which must, to the user, be completely trustworthy. The operating system kernel, which interacts directly with the hardware, or init system is able to detect whether the secure attention key has been pressed. When this event is detected, the trusted login processing is started.

The secure attention key is designed to make login spoofing impossible, as the kernel will suspend any program, including those masquerading as the computer's login process, before starting a trustable login operation.

== Examples ==
Some examples are:

- Ctrl+Alt+⇧ Shift+Esc: Introduced in systemd v257 as a more reliable SAK for Linux distributions but may require support from the currently running desktop environment. It is implemented as of gdm (GNOME display manager) 47.
- Ctrl+Alt+← Backspace on X Window System immediately kills the X server (although the key combination can be disabled) and can be used to quickly and easily get back to the login prompt.
- Alt+SysRq+K default sequence for Linux. Not a true C2-compliant SAK.
- Ctrl+X then Ctrl+R on AIX, but it can be disabled.
- ⇧ Shift+Stop for PLATO IV in the 1970s.
- Ctrl+Alt+Delete for Windows NT.

== See also ==
- Control-Alt-Delete
- Magic SysRq key
- Break key
