= POST card =

Computer diagnostic interface card

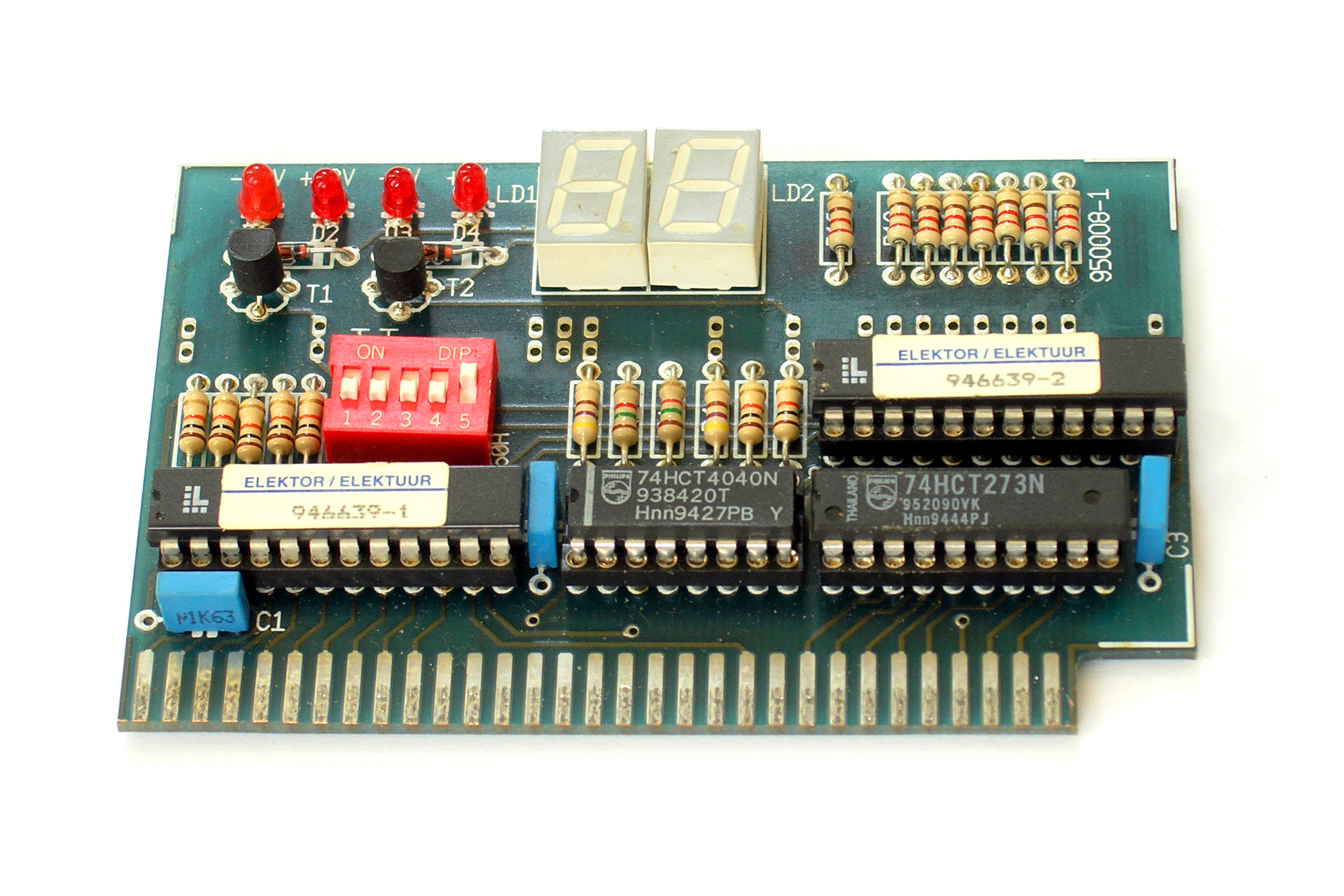
BIOS POST card for ISA bus. Two seven-segment displays show the POST-code. Four LEDs display presence of +/-5 V and +/-12 V.

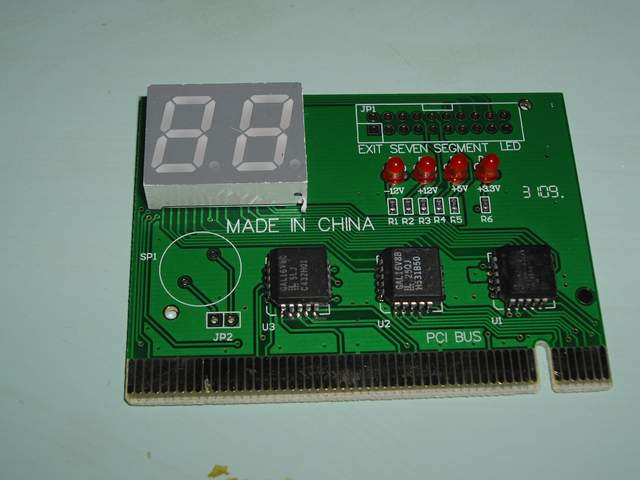
BIOS POST card for PCI bus

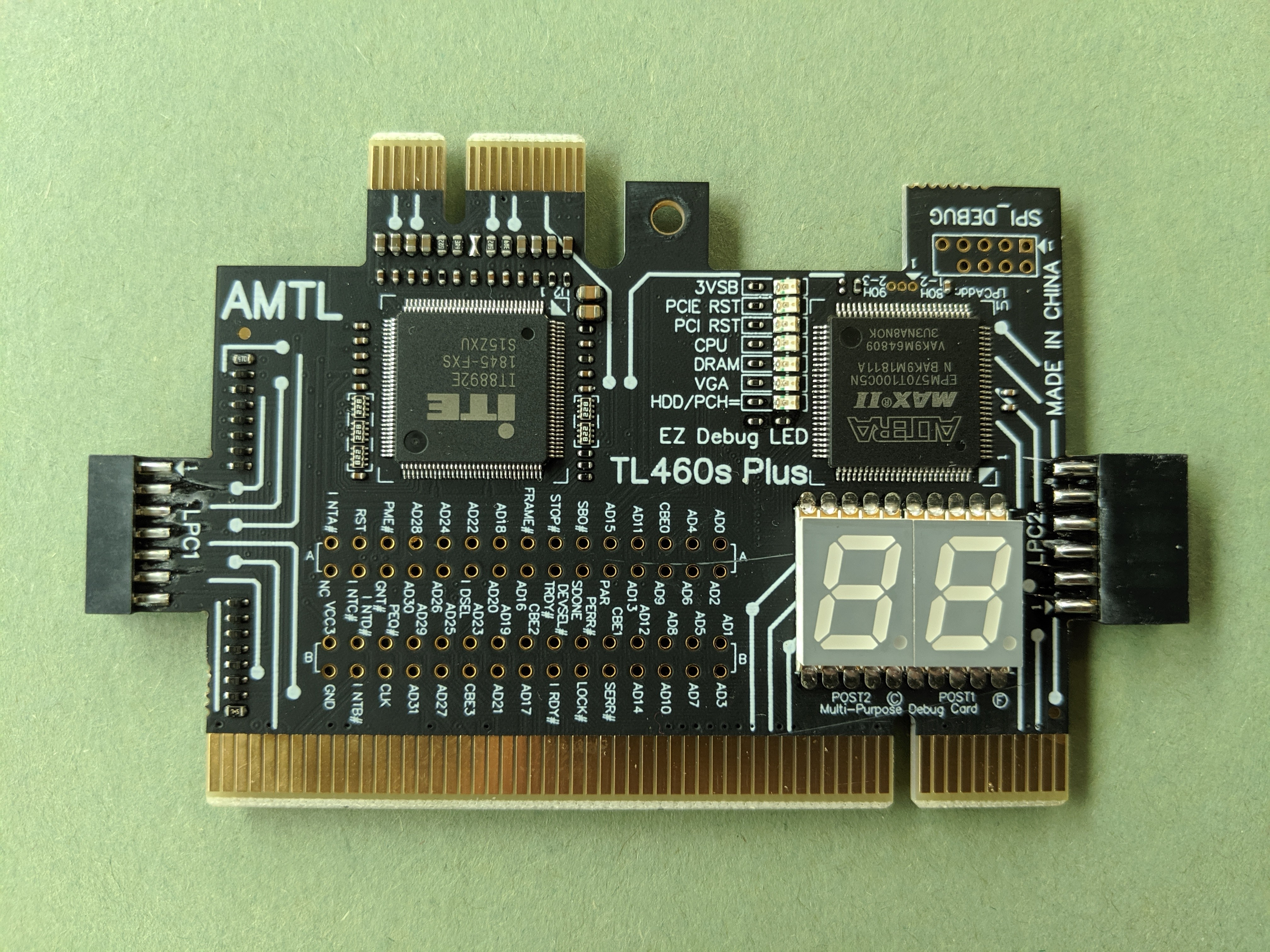
BIOS POST card with connectors for the PCI (bottom), PCIe (top) and LPC (left 2 mm and right 2.54 mm) busses

In computing, a POST card is a plug-in diagnostic interface card that displays progress and error codes generated during power-on self-test (POST) of a computer. It is used to troubleshoot computers that fail to boot.

== Working principle ==
At a minimum, if the CPU, BIOS, and the I/O interface upon which the POST card relies on are all working, a POST card can be used to monitor the system's Power-On Self Test (POST), or to diagnose problems with it. The system introduced on IBM PC computers sends 8-bit byte codes (usually displayed as two hexadecimal digits) to a specified I/O port (usually 80 hex) during startup, some indicating a stage in the startup procedure, others identifying errors. The description for each code must be looked up in a table for the particular BIOS. For example, for the 1984 IBM PC/AT code 1D is issued when about to Determine Memory Size Above 1024K, and code 2D in the event of 8042 Keyboard Controller Failure, 105 System Error. If startup does not complete successfully, either an error code, or the code of the last operation performed, is available.

POST cards provide information even when a standard display is not available, either because connecting a monitor is impractical, or because the failure occurs before the video subsystem is operational.

== Operation ==
POST cards are inserted into an expansion slot, and are available with connectors for the ISA (also supporting EISA), PCI, PCI Express, Mini PCIe (for laptops), Universal Serial Bus, or Low Pin Count bus, or for a parallel port. A typical card for desktop computers has a different bus interface on each edge; a card for laptop computers may have both a miniPCI and a parallel port connector (plus USB to supply power).

Modern motherboards often do not broadcast POST codes to their PCI Express slots (PCIe switches only pass on transactions after having been configured to do so by the BIOS). On such motherboards, the Low Pin Count (LPC) bus, an ISA variant normally used to connect a Trusted Platform Module (TPM), may be the only bus where POST messages can still be seen. However LPC connectors are not standardized, with between 9 and 19 pins and both 2.54 mm and 2 mm pin headers commonly used. Therefore, an LPC POST card may have to auto-detect first the pin assignment used.

Another option are USB POST cards such as AMI Debug Rx, which use the debug port common on USB 2.0 EHCI controllers.

Information on the meaning of POST codes for different BIOSes is needed to interpret the codes. This may be supplied with cards, but becomes dated as later BIOSes are issued; more up-to-date information may be available on manufacturers' and independent websites.

In addition to displaying numeric codes, many cards monitor power supply voltages, clock and oscillator signals, reset signal, and other parameters.

== Usage scenarios ==
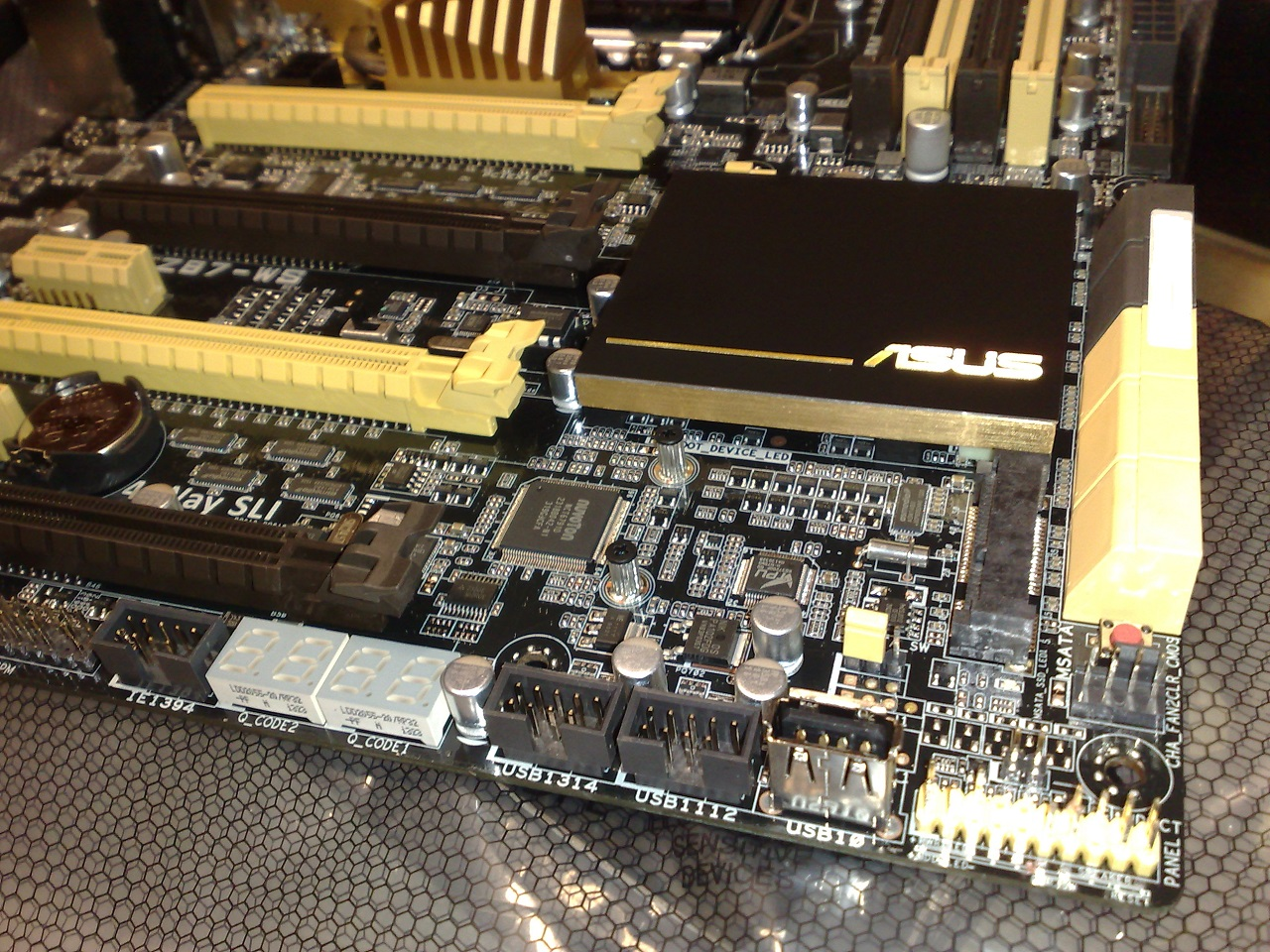
Two POST seven-segment displays ("Q_CODE1" and "Q_CODE2", lower-left), integrated on a computer motherboard

Diagnostic cards are today mainly used by designers of motherboards and extension cards, along with logic analyzers and other debug tools and interfaces. They are less commonly used in the 21st century for computer repair and by system integrators, but remain available. POST cards for PCs, while originally high-priced, cost from just a few US dollars upwards in the 21st century.

Some motherboards have a built-in display to diagnose hardware problems. Most also report POST errors with audible beeps, if a PC speaker is attached. Such motherboards make POST cards less necessary.

When these diagnostic cards were first introduced motherboards were expensive and well worth troubleshooting and repairing. By the late twentieth century large scale integration, mass production made motherboards inexpensive components. Motherboards were rarely repaired, but replaced; the main purpose of a POST card is to determine that parts mounted on the motherboard itself, rather than plugged-in video cards, RAM, etc. are at fault.

== See also ==
- Power-on self-test
- Debug port
