= Abort (computing) =

Unscheduled termination of a process

In a computer or data transmission system, to abort means to terminate, usually in a controlled manner, a processing activity because it is impossible or undesirable for the activity to proceed or in conjunction with an error. Such an action may be accompanied by diagnostic information on the aborted process.

In addition to being a verb, abort also has two noun senses. In the most general case, the event of aborting can be referred to as an abort. Sometimes the event of aborting can be given a special name, as in the case of an abort involving a Unix kernel where it is known as a kernel panic. Specifically in the context of data transmission, an abort is a function invoked by a sending station to cause the recipient to discard or ignore all bit sequences transmitted by the sender since the preceding flag sequence.

In the C programming language, abort() is a standard library function that terminates the current application and returns an error code to the host environment.

== Types of aborts ==
1. User-Initiated Aborts: Users can often abort tasks using keyboard shortcuts (like Ctrl + C in terminal applications) or commands to terminate processes. This is especially useful for stopping unresponsive programs or those taking longer than expected to execute.
2. Programmatic Aborts: Developers can implement abort logic in their code. For instance, when a program encounters an error or invalid input, it may call functions like abort() in C or C++ to terminate execution. This approach helps prevent further errors or potential data corruption.
3. System-Level Aborts: Operating systems might automatically abort processes under certain conditions, such as resource exhaustion or unresponsiveness. For example, a watchdog timer can terminate a process that remains idle beyond a specified time limit.
4. Database Transactions: In database management, aborting (often termed ‘rolling back’) a transaction is crucial for maintaining data integrity. If a transaction cannot be completed successfully, aborting it returns the database to its previous state, which ensures that incomplete transactions don't leave the data inconsistent.

Aborts are typically logged, especially in critical systems, to facilitate troubleshooting and improve future runs.

== See also ==
- Abort, Retry, Fail?
- Abnormal end
- Crash
- Hang
- Reset
- Reboot
