= TI-86 =

Graphing calculator produced by Texas Instruments

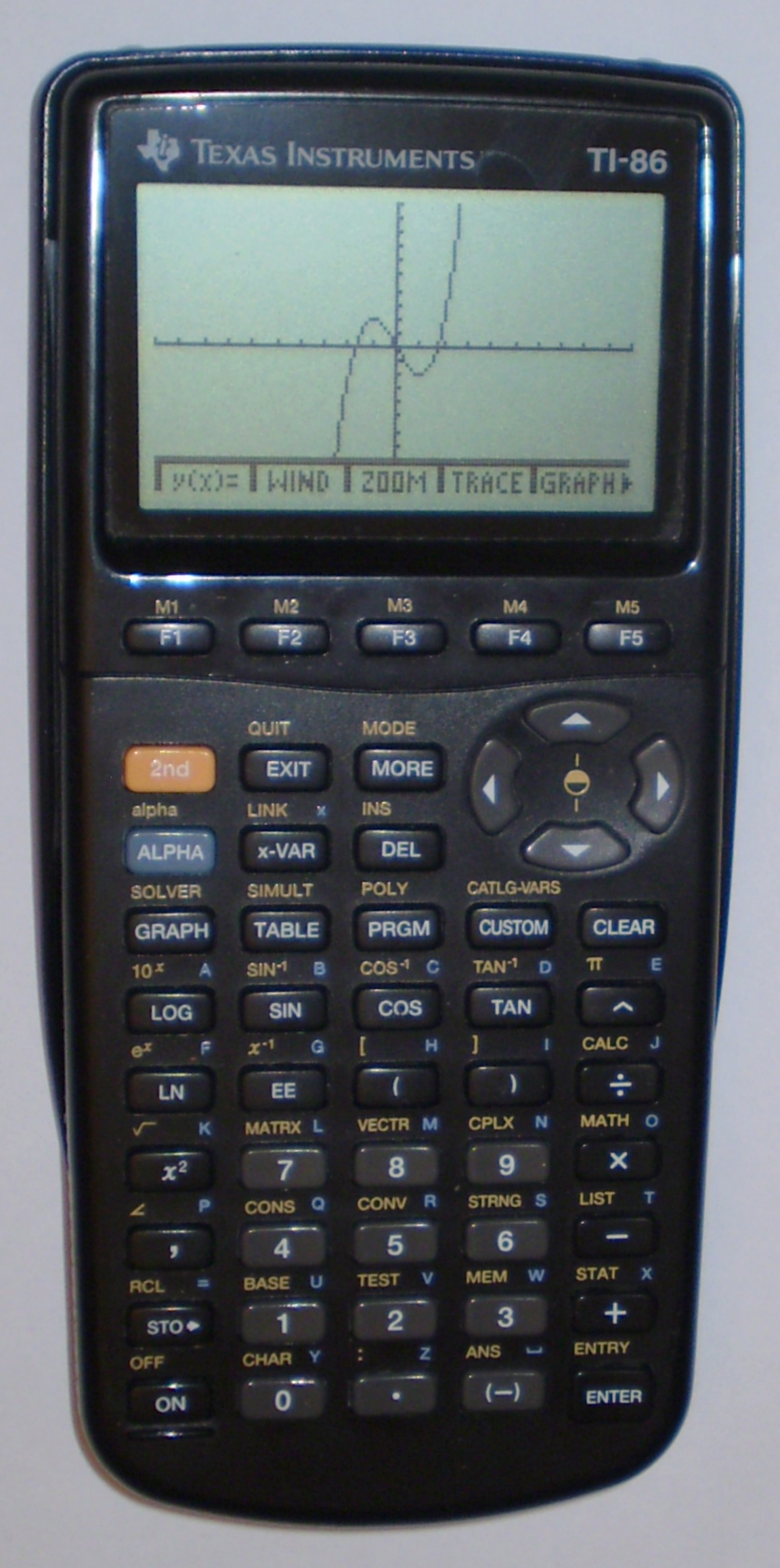
- Type: Graphing calculator
- Manufacturer: Texas Instruments
- Introduced: 1996
- Discontinued: 2006
- Latest firmware: 1.6
- Predecessor: TI-85

Calculator
- Entry mode: D.A.L.
- Display size: 128×64 pixels, 21×8 characters

CPU
- Processor: Zilog Z80
- Frequency: 6 MHz

Programming
- User memory: 96 kB of RAM

Other
- Power supply: 4 AAA's, 1 CR1616 or CR1620

The TI-86 is a programmable graphing calculator introduced in 1996 which was produced by Texas Instruments, it is powered by a Zilog Z80 microprocessor, as used in the TI-73 and TI-81 to TI-86. It is partially backwards-compatible with its predecessor, the TI-85.

In addition to having a larger screen than the TI-83, the TI-86 also allows the user to type in lower case and Greek letters and features five softkeys, which improve menu navigation and can be programmed by the user for quick access to common operations such as decimal-to-fraction conversion. The calculator also handles vectors, matrices and complex numbers better than the TI-83. One drawback, however, is that the statistics package on the TI-83 range doesn't come preloaded on the TI-86. However, it can be downloaded from the Texas Instruments program archive and installed on the calculator using the link cable.

The TI-86 has been discontinued.

== Specifications ==
- CPU: Zilog Z80 6 MHz
- RAM: 128 KB, 96 KB user-accessible
- ROM: 256 KB non-upgradable
- Display: 128×64 pixels high-contrast monochrome LCD
- Data Communication: Serial link port; allows two TI-86 calculators to be connected to each other, or one TI-86 to be connected to a PC, for data transfer via a special link cable
- Programming Languages: TI-BASIC, Z80 Assembly language (ASM)
- Power: 4×AAA, 1×CR1616 or CR1620 (for backup power)

== See also ==
- Comparison of Texas Instruments graphing calculators
