= Login spoofing =

Techniques used to steal a user's password

Login spoofings are techniques used to steal a user's password. The user is presented with an ordinary looking login prompt for username and password, which is actually a malicious program (usually called a Trojan horse) under the control of the attacker. When the username and password are entered, this information is logged or in some way passed along to the attacker, breaching security.

To prevent this, some operating systems require a special key combination (called a secure attention key) to be entered before a login screen is presented, for example Control-Alt-Delete. Users should be instructed to report login prompts that appear without having pressed this secure attention sequence. Only the kernel, which is the part of the operating system that interacts directly with the hardware, can detect whether the secure attention key has been pressed, so it cannot be intercepted by third party programs (unless the kernel itself has been compromised).

== Similarity to phishing ==
While similar to login spoofing, phishing usually involves a scam in which victims respond to unsolicited e-mails that are either identical or similar in appearance to a familiar site which they may have prior affiliation with. Login spoofing usually is indicative of a much more heinous form of vandalism or attack in which case the attacker has already gained access to the victim computer to at least some degree.

== Internet ==
Internet-based login spoofing can be caused by

- compromised sites
- typosquatting
