= TI-81 =

Graphing calculator produced by Texas Instruments

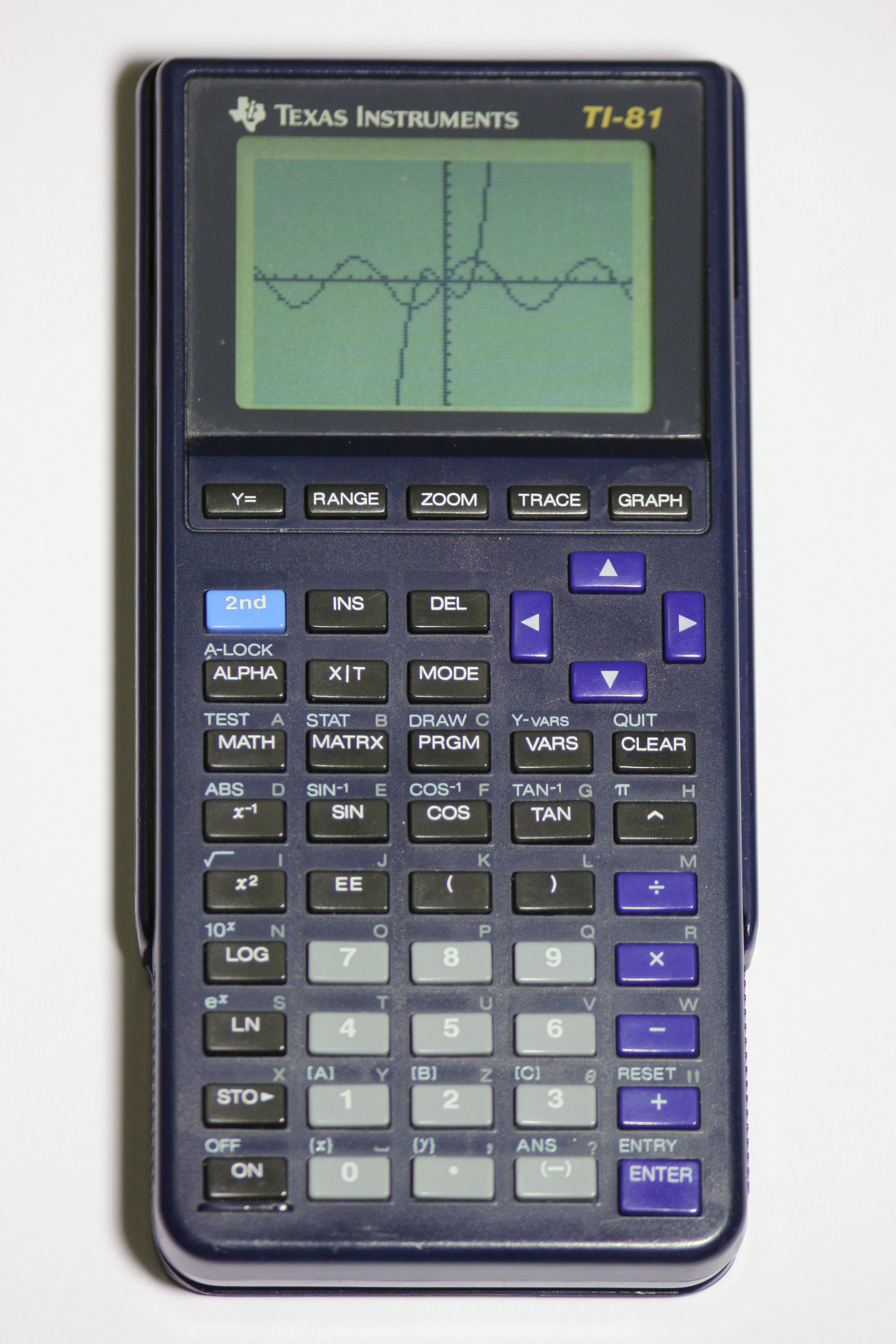
- A 1994 TI-81 showing graphs
- Type: Graphing calculator
- Manufacturer: Texas Instruments
- Introduced: 1990
- Discontinued: 1997
- Successor: TI-82

Calculator
- Entry mode: D.A.L.
- Precision: 13 digits
- Display size: 96×64 pixels, 16×8 characters

CPU
- Processor: Zilog Z80
- Frequency: 5 MHz or 6 MHz

Programming
- Programming language(s): TI-BASIC, Assembly
- User memory: 2400 bytes of RAM

Other
- Power supply: 4 AAAs, 1 CR1616 or CR1620
- Weight: 168 grams (5.9 oz)
- Dimensions: 173 mm × 79 mm × 22 mm (6.8 in × 3.1 in × 0.85 in)

The TI-81 was the first graphing calculator made by Texas Instruments. It was designed in 1990 for use in algebra and pre-calculus courses. Since its release, it has been superseded by a series of newer calculators; most of these are functionally similar to the TI-81, with the exception of the TI-Nspire series.

== Features ==
The TI-81 is powered by a Zilog Z80 microprocessor, as used in the TI-73 and TI-81 to TI-86 graphing calculators. However, its processor is clocked at 2 MHz, whereas the others run at a frequency of either 6 or 15 MHz. It has 2.4 KB of user-accessible RAM, with additional RAM being allocated to the calculator's internal firmware.

The calculator uses Texas Instruments' own in-house operating system, the Equation Operating System; the firmware used by all other Texas Instruments graphing calculators derive from this. The TI-81 can perform two-dimensional parametric graphing—in addition to standard two-dimensional function graphing, trigonometric calculations in units of either degrees or radians, simple drawing, the creation and manipulation of matrices up to a size of 6 by 6, and the execution of simple programs in a proprietary, statement-based language.

In late 2009 an exploit was found that can be used to execute machine code on the TI-81, using manual input of code. The TI-81 has no data link interface; its only means of input and output are the keyboard and screen.

Like most other Texas Instruments graphing calculators, the TI-81 is powered by four AAA batteries and one button cell backup battery; the backup battery ensures that programs loaded in memory are retained during battery changes. Some early TI-81 units omit the backup battery.

Texas Instruments produced an emulator for the TI-81 and its Equation Operating System on a desktop computer; it is compatible with MS-DOS.

== See also ==
- Comparison of Texas Instruments graphing calculators
