= Power-on self-test =

Process performed by firmware or software routines

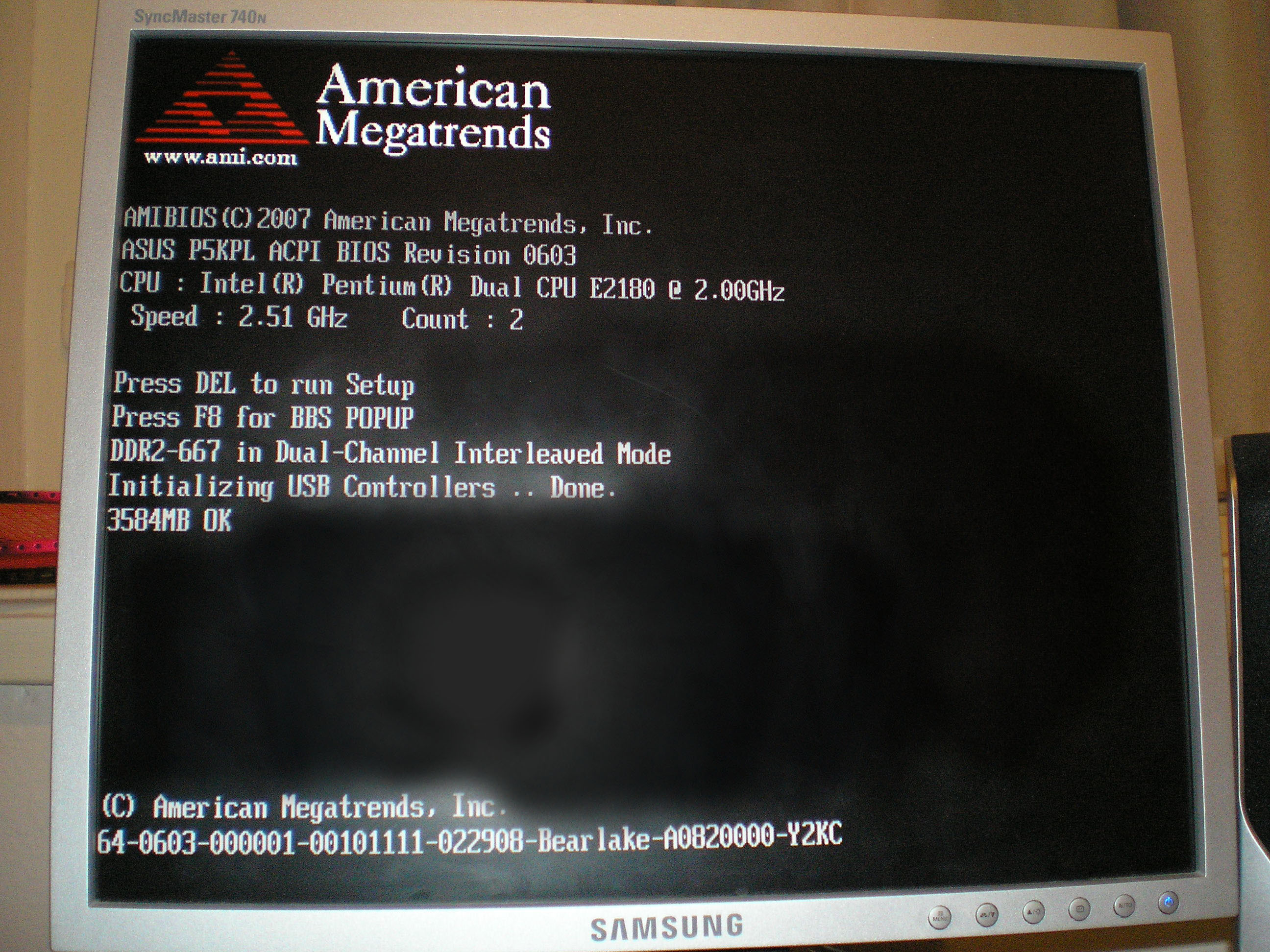
Typical POST screen (AMI BIOS)

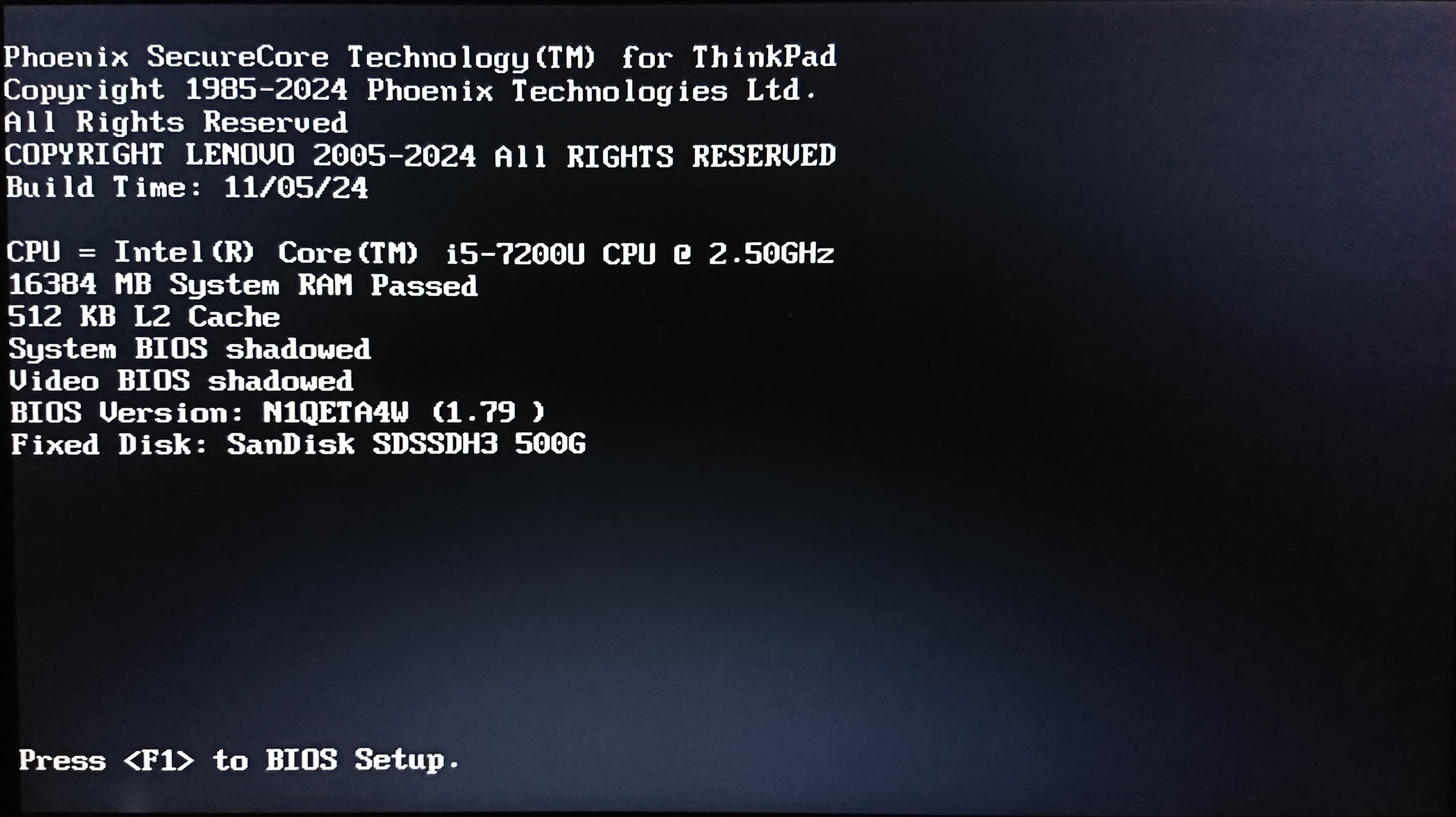
Typical UEFI-compliant BIOS POST screen (Phoenix Technologies BIOS)

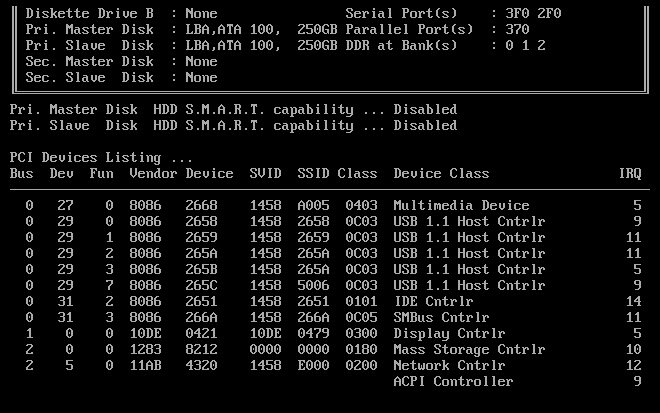
Summary screen after POST and before booting an operating system (Award BIOS)

A power-on self-test (POST) is a process performed by firmware or software routines immediately after a computer or other digital electronic device is powered on.

POST processes may set the initial state of the device and detect if any hardware components are non-functional. The results of the POST may be displayed on a panel that is part of the device, output to an external device, or stored for future retrieval by a diagnostic tool. In some computers, an indicator lamp or a speaker may be provided to show error codes as a sequence of flashes or beeps in the event that a computer display malfunctions.

POST routines are part of a computer's pre-boot sequence. If they complete successfully, the bootstrap loader code is invoked to load an operating system.

In IBM PC compatible computers, the main duties of POST are handled by the BIOS or UEFI.

== IBM-compatible PC POST ==
In IBM PC compatible computers, the main duties of POST are handled by the BIOS or UEFI, which may hand some of these duties to other programs designed to initialize very specific peripheral devices, notably for video and SCSI initialization. These other duty-specific programs are generally known collectively as option ROMs or individually as the video BIOS, SCSI BIOS, etc.

=== History ===
In earlier BIOSes, up to around the turn of the millennium, the POST would perform a thorough test of all devices, including a complete memory test. This design by IBM was modeled after their larger mainframe systems, which would perform a complete hardware test as part of their cold-start process. As the PC platform evolved into more of a commodity consumer device, the mainframe- and minicomputer-inspired high-reliability features such as parity memory and the thorough memory test in every POST were dropped from most models. The exponential growth of PC memory sizes, driven by the equally exponential drop in memory prices, was also a factor in this, as the duration of a memory test using a given CPU is directly proportional to the memory size.

The original IBM PC could be equipped with as little as 16 KB of RAM and typically had between 64 and 640 KB; depending on the amount of equipped memory, the computer's 4.77 MHz 8088 required between 5 seconds and 1.5 minutes to complete the POST, and there was no way to skip it. Beginning with the IBM XT, a memory count was displayed during POST instead of a blank screen. A modern PC with a bus rate of around 1 GHz and a 32-bit bus might be 2000 or even 5000 times faster, but might have many more gigabytes of memory. With boot times more of a concern now than in the 1980s, the 30- to 60-second memory test adds undesirable delay for a benefit of confidence that is not perceived to be worth that cost by most users. Most clone PC BIOSes allowed the user to skip the POST RAM check by pressing a key, and more modern machines (2000s and later) often performed no RAM test at all unless it was enabled via the BIOS setup. In addition, modern DRAM is significantly more reliable than DRAM was in the 1980s.

=== Purposes ===
During the POST, the BIOS must integrate multiple competing, changing, and even mutually exclusive standards and initiatives for the matrix of hardware and operating systems the PC is expected to support, although at most only simple memory tests and the setup screen are displayed. The principal duties of the main BIOS during POST include:

- verify CPU registers
- verify the integrity of the BIOS code itself
- verify some basic components like DMA, timer, interrupt controller
- initialize, size, and verify system main memory
- initialize BIOS
- pass control to other specialized extension BIOSes (if installed)
- identify, organize, and select which devices are available for booting

The functions above are served by the POST in all BIOS versions back to the very first. In later BIOS versions, POST will also:

- initialize chipset
- discover, initialize, and catalog all system buses and devices
- provide a user interface for system's configuration
- construct whatever system environment is required by the target operating system

In early BIOSes, POST did not organize or select boot devices; it simply identified floppy or hard disks, which the system would always try to boot in that order.

=== Process ===
The BIOS begins its POST when the CPU is reset. The first memory location the CPU tries to execute is known as the reset vector. In the case of a hard reboot, the northbridge will direct a code fetch request to the BIOS located on the system flash memory. For a warm boot, the BIOS will be located in the proper place in RAM and the northbridge will direct the reset vector call to the RAM. In earlier PC systems, before chipsets were standard, the BIOS ROM would be located at an address range that included the reset vector, and BIOS ran directly out of ROM. This is why the motherboard BIOS ROM is in segment F000 in the conventional memory map.

During the POST flow of a contemporary BIOS, one of the first things a BIOS should do is determine the reason it is executing. For a cold boot, for example, it may need to execute all of its functionality. If, however, the system supports power-saving or quick-boot methods, the BIOS may be able to circumvent the standard POST device discovery and simply program the devices from a preloaded system device table.

As part of the starting sequence the POST routines may display a prompt to the user for a key press to access built-in setup functions of the BIOS. This allows the user to set various options particular to the motherboard before the operating system is loaded. If no key is pressed, the POST will proceed on to the boot sequence required to load the installed operating system.

Many modern BIOS and UEFI implementations show a manufacturer's logo during POST and hide the classic text screens unless an error occurs. The text screen can often be enabled in the BIOS settings by disabling the "Quiet Boot" option.

=== Progress and error reporting ===
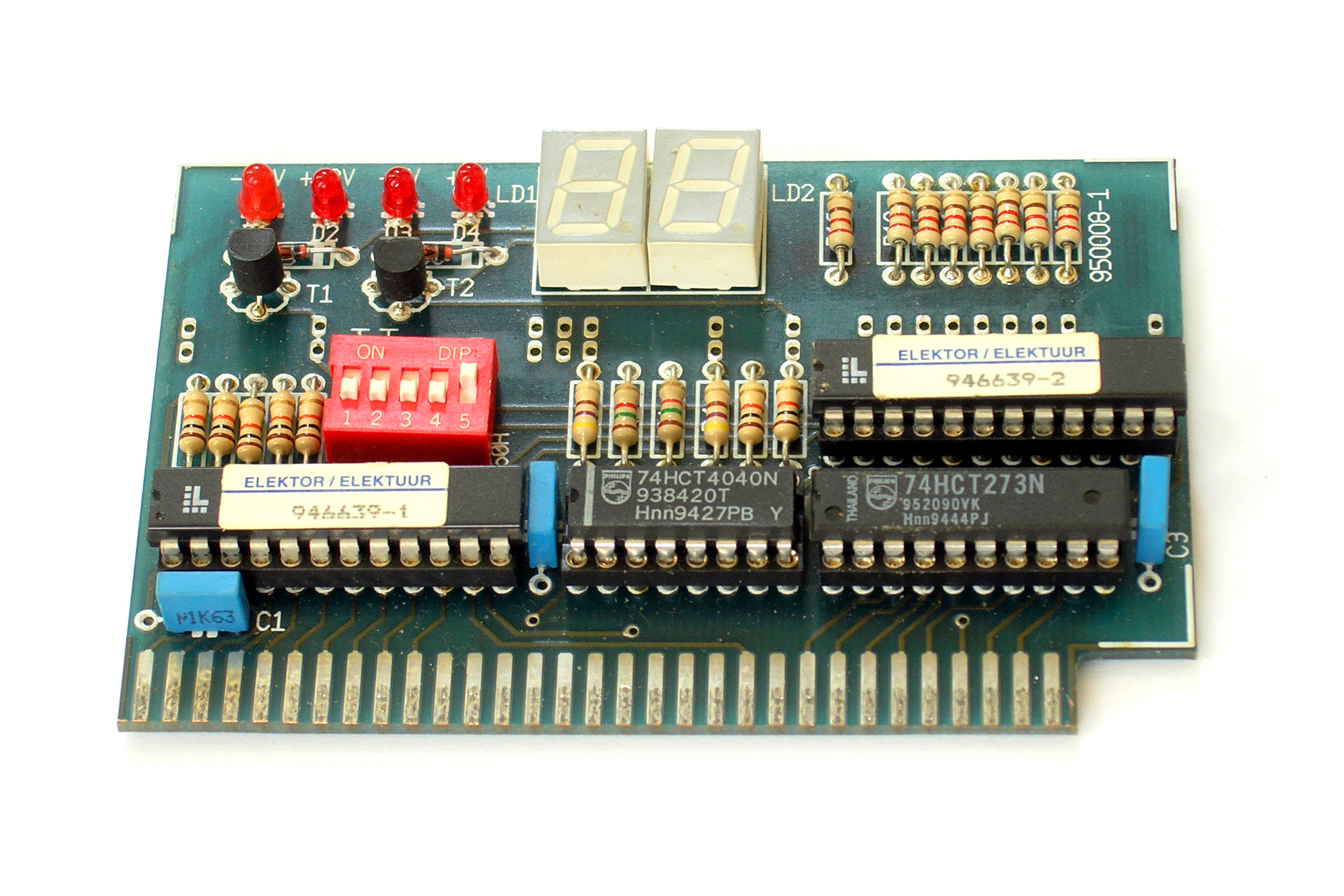
BIOS POST card for ISA bus

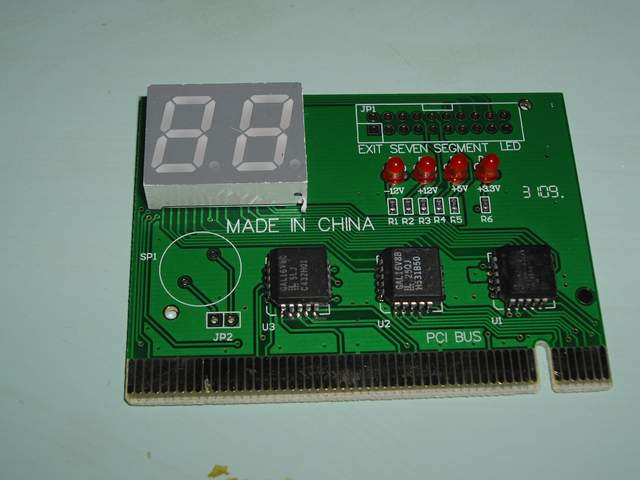
BIOS POST card for PCI bus

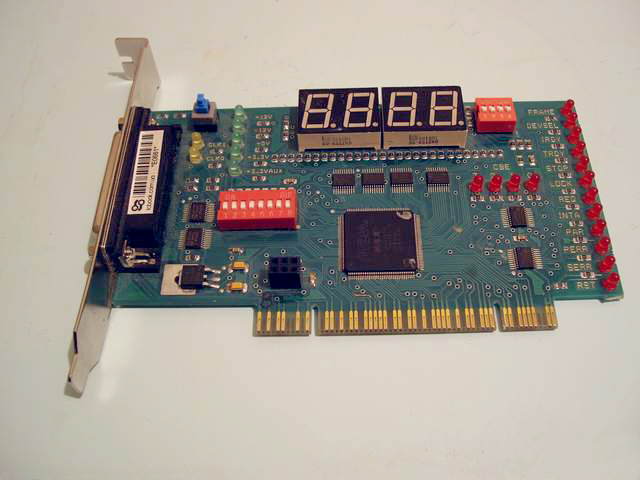
Professional BIOS POST card for PCI bus

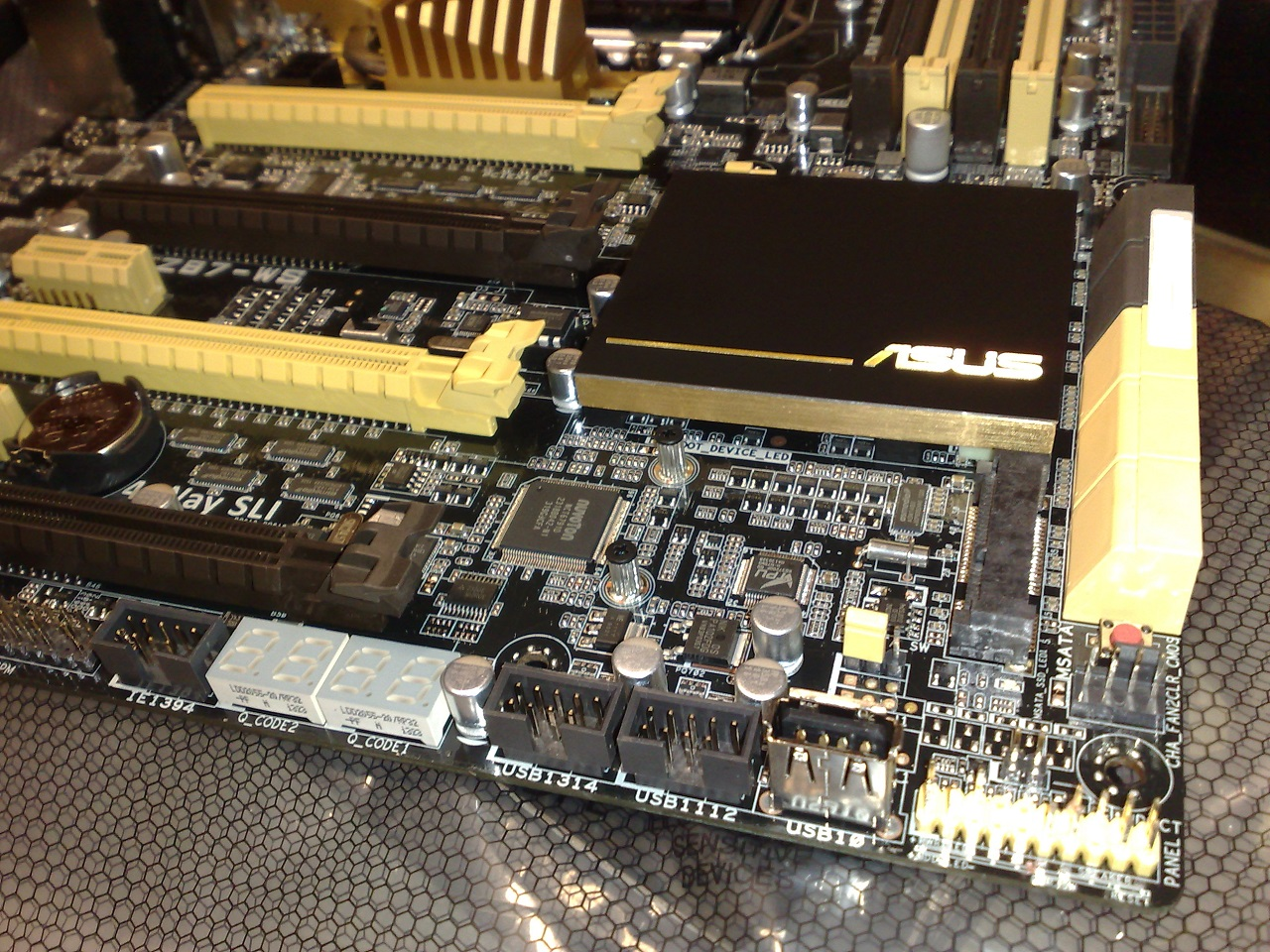
Two POST seven-segment displays integrated on a computer motherboard

The original IBM BIOS made POST diagnostic information available by outputting a number to I/O port 0x80 (a screen display was not possible with some failure modes). Both progress indication and error codes were generated; in the case of a failure which did not generate a code, the code of the last successful operation was available to aid in diagnosing the problem. Using a logic analyzer or a dedicated POST card‍—‌an interface card that shows port 0x80 output on a small display‍—‌a technician could determine the origin of the problem. Once an operating system is running on the computer the code displayed by such a board may become meaningless, since some OSes, e.g. Linux, use port 0x80 for I/O timing operations. The actual numeric codes for the possible stages and error conditions differ from one BIOS supplier to another. Codes for different BIOS versions from a single supplier may also vary, although many codes remain unchanged in different versions.

Later BIOSes used a sequence of beeps from the motherboard-attached PC speaker (if present and working) to signal error codes. Some vendors developed proprietary variants or enhancements, such as MSI's D-Bracket. POST beep codes vary from manufacturer to manufacturer.

Information on numeric and beep codes is available from manufacturers of BIOSes and motherboards. There are websites which collect codes for many BIOSes.

==== Original IBM POST beep codes ====
Beeps	Meaning
1 short beep	Normal POST – system is OK
2 short beeps	POST error – error code shown on screen
No beep	Power supply, system board problem, disconnected CPU, or disconnected speaker
Continuous beep	Power supply, system board, RAM or keyboard problem
Repeating short beeps	Power supply, system board or keyboard problem
1 long, 1 short beep	System board problem
1 long, 2 short beeps	Display adapter problem (MDA, CGA)
1 long, 3 short beeps	Enhanced Graphics Adapter problem (EGA)
3 long beeps	3270 keyboard card error

==== POST AMI BIOS beep codes ====
Beeps	Meaning
1	Memory refresh timer error
2	Parity error in base memory (first 64 KiB block)
3	Base memory read/write test error
4	Motherboard timer not operational (check all PSU to MB connectors seated)
5	Processor failure
6	8042 Gate A20 test error (cannot switch to protected mode)
7	General exception error (processor exception interrupt error)
8	Display memory error (system video adapter)
9	AMI BIOS ROM checksum fix
10	CMOS shutdown register read/write fix
11	Cache memory test failed
continuous beeping	Motherboard does not detect a RAM module

==== POST beep codes on CompTIA A+ certification exam ====
These POST beep codes are covered specifically on the CompTIA A+ Exam:

Beeps	Meaning
Steady, short beeps	Power supply may be bad
Long continuous beep tone	Memory failure
Steady, long beeps	Power supply bad
No beep	Power supply bad, system not plugged in, or power not turned on
No beep	If everything seems to be functioning correctly there may be a problem with the 'beeper' itself. The system will normally beep one short beep.
One long, two short beeps	Video card failure

==== IBM POST diagnostic code descriptions ====
Code	Meaning
100–199	System boards
200–299	Memory
300–399	Keyboard
400–499	Monochrome display
500–599	Color/graphics display
600–699	Floppy-disk drive or adapter
700–799	Math coprocessor
900–999	Parallel printer port
1000–1099	Alternate printer adapter
1100–1299	Asynchronous communication device, adapter, or port
1300–1399	Game port
1400–1499	Color/graphics printer
1500–1599	Synchronous communication device, adapter, or port
1700–1799	Hard drive or adapter (or both)
1800–1899	Expansion unit (XT)
2000–2199	Bisynchronous communication adapter
2400–2599	EGA system-board video (MCA)
3000–3199	LAN adapter
4800–4999	Internal modem
7000–7099	Phoenix BIOS chips
7300–7399	3.5-inch disk drive
8900–8999	MIDI adapter
11200–11299	SCSI adapter
21000–21099	SCSI fixed disk and controller
21500–21599	SCSI CD-ROM system

== Macintosh POST ==
Apple's Macintosh computers also perform a POST after a cold boot. In the event of a fatal error, the Mac will not make its startup chime.

=== Old World Macs (until 1998) ===
Macs made before 1987, upon failing the POST, crashed silently without playing any sound and froze, with a single hexadecimal string and a Sad Mac icon on the screen, if working. Macs made after 1987 but before 1998, upon failing the POST, will immediately halt with a "death chime", which is a sound that varies by model; it can be a simple beep, a car crash sound, the sound of shattering glass, a short musical tone, or more. On the screen, if working, will be the Sad Mac icon, along with two hexadecimal strings, which can be used to identify the problem. Some Macs made during that same time period do not use a death chime like Macs made before 1987, but retained the same format as those that used the death chimes, such as the presence of the Sad Mac icon and two hexadecimal strings on screen. Old World Macs based on PCI architecture before 1998 don’t display a Sad Mac icon nor the hexadecimal strings on screen and only play the death chime.

=== New World Macs (1998–1999) ===
When Apple introduced the iMac in 1998, it was a radical departure from other Macs of the time. The iMac began the production of New World Macs, as they are called; New World Macs, such as the iMac G3, Power Macintosh G3 (Blue & White), Power Mac G4 (PCI Graphics), PowerBook G3 (bronze keyboard), and PowerBook G3 (FireWire), load the Mac OS ROM from the hard drive. In the event of an error that is not a fatal hardware error, they display the same screen as seen when holding ⌘ Command+⌥ Option+O+F at startup but with the error message instead of the "0 >" prompt. In the event of a fatal hardware error, they give these beeps:

Beeps	Meaning
1	No RAM installed/detected
2	Incompatible RAM type installed (for example, EDO)
3	No RAM banks passed memory testing
4	Bad checksum for the remainder of the boot ROM
5	Bad checksum for the ROM boot block

=== New World Macs (1999 onward) ===
The beep codes were revised in October 1999. In addition, on some models, the power LED will flash in cadence.

Beeps	Meaning
1	No RAM installed/detected
2	Incompatible RAM types
3	No good banks
4	No good boot images in the boot ROM, bad sys config block, or both
5	Processor is not usable

=== Intel-based Macs ===
With the introduction of Intel-based Macs using UEFI, the startup tones were changed again. These tones are not present in Intel-based Macs equipped with a T2 security chip, as they handle the POST process differently from those without a T2 security chip.

Tones	Meaning
One tone, repeating every five seconds	No RAM installed/detected
Three successive tones followed by a repeating five-second pause	Incompatible RAM types; No good banks
One long tone while the power button is held down	EFI ROM update in progress (For Macs made until 2012)
Three long tones, three short tones, three long tones	EFI ROM corruption detected, ROM recovery in process

=== Apple silicon-based Macs ===
The Mac transition to Apple silicon marked a radical change in the POST process in Macs. Unlike most Intel-based Macs with UEFI, Apple silicon-based Macs use a boot ROM that loads the Low-Level Bootloader (LLB), similar to that of the firmware for the iPhone and iPad. No audible beep codes or tones are used to indicate hardware failures, similar to Intel-based Macs equipped with a T2 security chip. In the event of an error that is not a fatal hardware error, an exclamation mark will be displayed on the screen or the device will go into Device Firmware Update (DFU) mode. In the event of a fatal hardware error, no audio or visual feedback is provided. In addition, on some models, the power LED will flash in cadence.

== Amiga POST ==
Amiga historical line of computers, from A1000 to 4000 present an interesting POST sequence that prompts the user with a sequence of flashing screens of different colors (rather than audible beeps as in other systems) to show if various hardware POST tests were correct or else if they failed:

=== POST sequence of Amiga ===
The Amiga system performs the following steps at boot:

1. Delays beginning the tests a fraction of a second to allow the hardware to stabilize.
2. Jumps to ROM code in diagnostic card (if found)
3. Disables and clears all DMA and interrupts.
4. Turns on the screen.
5. Checks the general hardware configuration. If the screen remains a light gray color and the tests continue, the hardware is OK. If an error occurs, the system halts.
6. Performs checksum test on ROMs.

If the system fails the ROM test, the screen display turns red and the system halts.

=== Sequence for all main Amiga models ===
Almost all Amiga models present the same color sequence when turned on: black screen, dark gray, light gray color screens filling the entire monitor screen in a rapid sequence (Amigas usually take between 2 and 3 seconds to turn on and boot).

=== Color screens scheme ===
Color	Meaning
Red	Bad ROM
Yellow	CPU Exception Before Bootstrap Code is Loaded
Green	Bad Chip RAM or failure of Agnus Chip (check seating of Agnus)
Black	No CPU
Cyan	Rev 0.x Kickstarts - Kickstart Error
White	Expansion passed test successfully
Grey	Turn on
Constant white	Failure of CPU
Purple	Return from InitCode()

=== Sequence for A4000 ===
==== Correct tests color sequence scheme ====
A4000 presents just a light gray screen during its boot time (it just occurs in 2 or max 3 seconds)

- Light Gray
- = Initial hardware configuration tests passed
- = Initial system software tests passed
- = Final initialization test passed

==== Failed tests color scheme ====
Color	Meaning
Red	ROM Error - Reset or replace
Green	CHIP RAM error (reset AGNUS and re-test)
Blue	Custom Chip(s) Error
Yellow	68000 detected error before software trapped it (GURU)

=== Amiga keyboard LED error signals ===
Amiga keyboards function as intelligent peripherals managed by onboard microcontroller. At power-on, the keyboard performs an independent self-test of its internal ROM, RAM, and key matrix before communicating with the computer. If a fault is detected during this process, the keyboard reports the error by flashing its Cap Lock LED in sequence:

Blinks	Meaning
1	ROM checksum failure
2	RAM test failed
3	Watchdog timer failed
4	A shortcut exists between two row lines or one of the seven special keys (not implemented)

=== Embedded systems ===
Unlike general-purpose personal computers, embedded systems typically lack modular firmware interfaces like BIOS or UEFI and standard video displays. Instead, Power-On Self-Test (POST) routines in embedded systems are executed directly from the primary bootloader or initial microcode. Upon startup, these routines perform low-level hardware integrity checks—such as SRAM/DRAM pattern testing, Flash/ROM checksum or Cyclic Redundancy Check (CRC) verification, oscillator and clock stabilization checks, and internal register validation.

In safety-critical applications—such as automotive electronic control units (ECUs), medical devices, industrial controllers, and avionics—POST execution is often governed by industry functional safety standards, including ISO 26262, IEC 61508, IEC 62304, and IEC 60730. These systems use hardware- and software-based Built-In Self-Test (BIST) routines—such as memory March tests—to verify hardware integrity before enabling actuators, high-voltage systems, or motor drives.

Because dedicated user interfaces are often absent, POST error handling relies on low-overhead diagnostic feedback. If a critical fault is detected, the controller typically enters a pre-defined fail-safe state or hold-in-reset mode. Error information is logged as Diagnostic Trouble Codes (DTCs) in non-volatile memory (EEPROM or Flash memory), output via fieldbus or serial protocols (such as CAN bus, UART, or I²C), or signaled through status LED flash sequences and diagnostic buzzers.

== See also ==
- POST card
- Serial presence detect
