= ERD =

ERD or Erd may refer to:

== Organisations ==
- Economic Relations Division (Bangladesh), of the Bangladeshi Ministry of Finance
- Enfants Riches Déprimés, a fashion brand

== Science and technology ==
- Elastic recoil detection
- Emergency repair disk
- Entity–relationship diagram, a visual representation of an entity–relationship model
- Evolutionary rapid development
- Extended reach drilling
- Vaccine-associated enhanced respiratory disease, or simply enhanced respiratory disease (ERD)

== Others ==
- Emergency Reserve Decoration, a British military decoration
- Érd, a city in Hungary
- Erdington railway station, in England
- Electronic repeat dispensing (eRD) in the UK, operated by the NHS Electronic Prescription Service
- The IATA code for Berdiansk Airport in Ukraine
- The station code for East Richmond railway station, Sydney in Australia

== See also ==
- ERD Court, the Environment, Resources and Development Court in South Australia
