= Microsoft reserved partition =

Data storage portion for Microsoft Windows

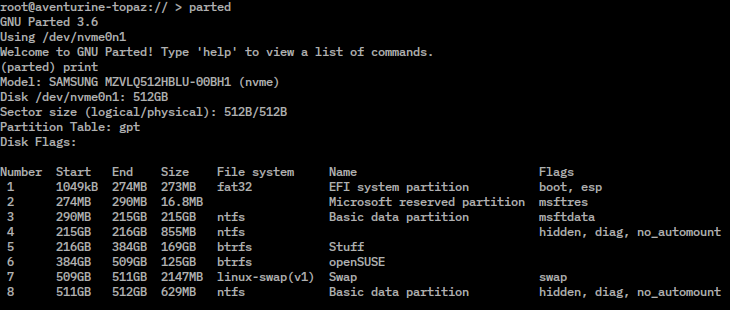
Example of a Microsoft Reserved Partition (MSR) within a GUID Partition Table (GPT). GNU Parted marked it with msftres flag

A Microsoft Reserved Partition (MSR) is a partition of a data storage device that uses the GUID Partition Table (GPT) layout. The Windows operating system uses this partition for compatibility purposes. No meaningful data is stored within the MSR. Rather, when compatibility needs arise, Windows shrinks this partition to make way for other special-purpose partitions, which may contain data. The GPT label for this partition type is E3C9E316-0B5C-4DB8-817D-F92DF00215AE.

== Purpose ==
Formerly, on disks formatted using the master boot record (MBR) partition layout, certain software components used hidden sectors of the disk for data storage purposes. For example, on dynamic disks, the Logical Disk Manager (LDM) stores metadata in a 1 MB area at the end of the disk which is not allocated to any partition.

The UEFI specification does not allow hidden sectors on GPT-formatted disks. Microsoft reserves a chunk of disk space using this MSR partition type to provide an alternative data storage space for such software components which previously may have used hidden sectors on MBR-formatted disks. Small, special-purpose partitions can be allocated from a portion of the space reserved in the MSR partition.

== Specifications ==
The MSR should be located after the EFI System Partition (ESP) and any OEM service partitions, but it must be located before Windows partition. Microsoft expects an MSR to be present on every GPT disk, and recommends it to be created as the disk is initially partitioned.

The GPT label for this partition type is E3C9E316-0B5C-4DB8-817D-F92DF00215AE.

The Microsoft-recommended size of MSR (which Windows Setup uses by default) is different for each version of Windows:

Windows version	MSR's size
Windows 7	128 MB
Windows 8 & 8.1	128 MB
Windows 10 & 11	16 MB

== See also ==
- Microsoft basic data partition (BDP)
- EFI system partition (ESP)
