= Unalive =

Unalive may refer to:

- Unalive, euphemistic slang for death

== Music ==
- "Unalive" (song), 2026 single by Marilyn Manson from One Assassination Under God – Chapter 2
- UnAlive, 2022 album by Mori Calliope
- "Unalive", track from Capsule Silence XXIV

== Media ==
- Unalive, 2018 video game released on the Wii U
- "Unalive" (Let's Play episode), 2025 episode of anime
