= One Assassination Under God – Chapter 2 =

Studio album by Marilyn Manson
- Released: August 14, 2026
- Recorded: April 2023 – April 2024
- Studios: The Abattoir (Los Angeles); NRG (Hollywood); EastWest (Hollywood)
- Length: 42:58 (CD/LP), 46:32 (Digital)
- Label: Nuclear Blast
- Producers: Tyler Bates; Marilyn Manson

Marilyn Manson chronology
One Assassination Under God – Chapter 1 (2024)	One Assassination Under God – Chapter 2 (2026)

Singles from One Assassination Under God – Chapter 2
- 1. "Exit Wound" Released: June 12, 2026; 2. "Front Toward Enemy" Released: July 17, 2026; 3. "Unalive" Released: August 14, 2026

One Assassination Under God – Chapter 2 is the thirteenth studio album by American rock band Marilyn Manson. It was released on August 14, 2026, by Nuclear Blast. It was written and co-produced by the band's eponymous vocalist, Marilyn Manson, and multi-instrumentalist Tyler Bates. "Exit Wound" was released as the lead single on June 12, followed by "Front Toward Enemy" on July 17 and "Unalive" on August 14.

The album received positive reviews upon release, with numerous publications praising Bates's production, Manson's vocals and lyricism, and the collaboration between the two. It was promoted by a continuation of the One Assassination Under God Tour, which began in 2024, and the Freaks on Parade Tour, a co-headlining tour with Rob Zombie, with Orgy and The Hu appearing as opening acts. The latter tour took place in North American arenas and amphitheatres in August and September.

== Background and recording ==
"Look, if you're really serious about doing the best work of your life, I will do that with you. Anything less than that isn't going to work for you anymore. You're in a place in life where you have one chance to show people that you're a serious person and that you're a great artist … The stuff you used to do isn't going to be good enough. You have to be open and honest with people in this music. If you're interested in doing that kind of work, then I'm into it."

— Tyler Bates talking to Marilyn Manson in 2023, prior to the recording of the albums.

One Assassination Under God – Chapter 2 was recorded between April 2023 and April 2024, the same time period One Assassination Under God – Chapter 1 (2024) was recorded. Every song on both albums were written and co-produced by Marilyn Manson and Tyler Bates. It is the band's fourth album to be produced or co-produced by Bates, following The Pale Emperor (2015), Heaven Upside Down (2017), and One Assassination Under God – Chapter 1.

Bates said he wanted Manson to be "open and honest" with the One Assassination Under God project, and that he wanted Manson to be "really serious about doing the best work of [his] life." The albums were primary recorded by Bates; the two of them would often be the only people present in the recording studio. Bates explained: "I play everything, I record everything, I record him. That's it. Just the two of us when we make these records. It is a very intimate conversation of music. And because we've worked this way, I know him probably better than anybody on this earth besides perhaps his wife … it's a really heavy, interesting thing."

== Release and promotion ==
Manson confirmed the album's release in a social media post in November 2025, saying: "It has been a great year since the release of Chapter One. Be prepared for Chapter Two very soon." In January 2026, co-producer Tyler Bates announced he amicably departed the live band in order to focus on his film score work. He said he would be "actively supporting" the upcoming album, which he described as their "finest work together". The same month, readers of Revolver voted it the second most anticipated album of 2026.

One Assassination Under God – Chapter 2 was released on August 14 by Nuclear Blast. Its track listing contains "Front Toward Enemy", a song that previously appeared as a B-side on the band's 2024 single "Raise the Red Flag". The record was issued in various formats, including CD, LP, cassette, and digital, and as a limited edition box set. The latter was limited to 3,000 copies worldwide, and contained exclusive collectables including art prints created by Manson. The album's release was confirmed on June 12. "Exit Wound" was released as the lead single the following day. Its music video was directed by Rizz and Gretchen Lanham. "Front Toward Enemy" was released as the album's second single on July 17. A music video, directed by Henri Alexander Levy, was released four days later. A music video for the third single, "Unalive", directed by Tony Silva, was released August 14, the day of the album's release.

The record was released the week before the beginning of the Freaks on Parade Tour, a North American arena and amphitheater co-headlining tour with Rob Zombie. It will take place in August and September, and features opening acts The Hu and Orgy. Manson's lineup for the tour includes former bassist and producer Tim Skold, who announced his return to the live band in February 2026 after an eighteen year absence, alongside drummer Gil Sharone, rhythm guitarist Piggy D. and former Black Light Burns guitarist Nick Annis. On 28 August, 2026, an "Expanded edition" of the album was released with the inclusion of a new track, "You Can’t Die Young".

== Artwork ==
The artwork for the album is a watercolor self-portrait created by Manson. Revolver noted similarities to Manson's appearance on the cover with the personification of Death in Ingmar Bergman's 1957 film The Seventh Seal.

On August 14, 2026, the day of the album's release, Manson opened a virtual art exhibit through his official website titled One Assassination Under God. The exhibit explores "a collection of original visual works alongside the music created to accompany them, with audio commentaries by Marilyn Manson".

== Critical reception ==
Professional ratings
Review scores
Source	Rating
AllMusic	3.5/5 stars
Blabbermouth.net	6.5/10
Sputnikmusic	4.3/5

The album received positive reviews upon release. AllMusic praised the collaboration between Manson and Bates, saying that when they collaborate, they "really click." They described Chapter 2 as "another solid Manson album, regardless of era, and Bates' keen ear for dramatic scope and catchy melody elevates Manson's vocals, which remain strong." They said that despite some uneven dips, the album provides fans of previous albums enough to "rejoice in another late(r) era album highlight." A staff writer for Sputnikmusic said Chapter 2 was less immediate than its predecessor on first listen, but that it reveals its qualities over repeated listens and provides "a nice counterpoint to Chapter 1." They said that despite sharing titles, Chapter 2 was incommensurable to Chapter 1, describing One Assassination Under God as "an eighty-six-minute concept album designed to be heard in its entirety". Tinnitist did not provide a review, but they included it on their list of albums of the week.

In a mixed review, Blabbermouth.net said that when compared to its predecessor, Chapter 2 "doesn't quite carry the same weight. It even borders on pedestrian." They complained the album lacked the riffs and "industrial musings" of its predecessor, saying it instead consists of an accessible sequence of songs comparable to their 1998 album Mechanical Animals. Conversely, Metal Planet Music rated the album 9 out of 10, and praised the collaboration between Manson and Bates. They said: "Where Chapter 1 carried the electric charge of a return nobody was sure would happen, Chapter 2 trades that novelty for craft, and craft, it turns out, is the thing this partnership has in abundance."

Ghost Cult Magazine also rated the album 9 out of 10, saying it "finds a balance of brooding melodicism and the in-your-face guitar grit and middle finger to the world attitude" of the band's other albums produced by Bates. Musically, they said Chapter 2 was darker than Chapter 1, and that on this album, Manson "rocks out harder than he has in some time". They also praised Manson's vocals, saying he sounds "almost as youthful as he did on Antichrist Superstar. He has more finesse in his nuanced performance." They also complimented Manson's lyrics, saying he "seems to be sorting through his recently more publicized life. He is not stepping into the villain role of his persona with the same fervor he once did, and perhaps that came with his more recent turn to sobriety. His edges are not lost, but more practiced and refined."

== Commercial performance ==
Industry trade publication Hits Daily Double confirmed the album sold 18,505 copies on its first week of release in the United States, with 16,609 in pure album sales and nearly 2,000 additional sales derived from album-equivalent units. The figure made it the fourth highest-selling physical album and new release of the week, but it entered the Billboard 200 at number 41, based on a lack of streaming activity. The position made it the band's first studio album to miss the top forty of the Billboard 200 since their 1994 debut, Portrait of an American Family. Despite this, the album debuted on seven different Billboard charts, of which five were top ten debuts. This included a number two debut on Top Hard Rock Albums, number four debuts on Top Album Sales and Vinyl Albums, number eight on Top Alternative Albums and number ten on Top Rock Albums.

Conversely, Chapter 2 outperformed Chapter 1 in several major European markets. It debuted at number 24 on the Dutch Album Top 100, in comparison to the number 66 peak of its predecessor. Chapter 2 peaked at numbers 32 and 3 in the Belgian territories of Flanders and Wallonia, respectively, higher than the number 112 and number 16 peaks Chapter 1 achieved in the same territories two years earlier. The record debuted within the top five of the German Albums Chart, and at number three on the Austrian Albums Chart, where Chapter 1 debuted at number six. Chapter 2 debuted at number 14 on both the Finnish Albums Chart and French Albums Chart, where Chapter 1 debuted at numbers 23 and 25, respectively. In Spain, it debuted at number 17 compared to a peak of number 31 for its predecessor, while it peaked at number 24 in Portugal compared to Chapter 1's peak of 46. It also debuted at number 7 in Poland, compared to a number 12 peak for Chapter 1.

In the United Kingdom, the Official Charts Company predicted the album was on course to debut within the top twenty of the UK Albums Chart, after it appeared at number eight on the UK Midweek Albums Chart. The album eventually debuted at number 27, with sales of 3,624 copies, making it the band's fourteenth entry on the UK Albums Chart. It also peaked at number two on the UK Rock & Metal Albums Chart. The album debuted at number 13 on the Australian Albums Chart, an improvement on Chapter 1, which peaked at number 44 on the same chart. The record debuted at number 30 on the New Zealand Albums Chart, compared to the number 35 debut of Chapter 1. In Japan, it debuted at number 34 on the main Oricon Albums Chart, with first week sales of 896 copies, based on two days of sales.

== Track listing ==
All tracks are written by Marilyn Manson and Tyler Bates.

One Assassination Under God – Chapter 2
No.	Title	Length
1.	"Unalive"	4:56
2.	"Don't Answer the Door"	4:26
3.	"Front Toward Enemy"	4:23
4.	"All the Vilest Things"	4:33
5.	"None of the Suns"	5:12
6.	"You Can't Die Young" (expanded digital edition bonus track)	3:35
7.	"Lucifer's Teardrop"	4:35
8.	"The Arsonist"	4:03
9.	"Exit Wound"	4:38
10.	"Enantiomorph"	6:12
Total length:		46:33

Notes

- An expanded digital edition of the album was released on August 28. "You Can't Die Young" was added as a free download to anyone who purchased the digital edition of the album. The song lasts 3:35, which brings the total length of that version of the album to 46:33, as opposed to the CD and vinyl length of 42:58.
- The vinyl edition does not include "You Can't Die Young", and moves "The Arsonist" to track five as the final song on side A, with "None of the Suns" and "Lucifer's Teardrop" moved down to appear as the first two songs on side B.

== Personnel ==
Credits adapted from the album's liner notes.

- Recorded at The Abattoir in Los Angeles, NRG Studios in North Hollywood, and EastWest Studios in Hollywood, between April 2023 and April 2024.

=== Marilyn Manson ===
- Marilyn Manson – vocals
- Tyler Bates – guitars, bass, keyboards, GuitarViol
- Gil Sharone – drums

=== Technical ===
- Marilyn Manson – composition, production, album artwork
- Tyler Bates – composition, recording, production
- Will Borza – mastering at Howie Weinberg Mastering
- Robert Carranza – recording and mixing
- Rob Kimura – artwork layout
- Jake Rene – second engineer at NRG Studios
- Lindsay Elizabeth Warner – photography
- Howie Weinberg – mastering at Howie Weinberg Mastering

== Charts ==
Chart performance for One Assassination Under God – Chapter 2
Chart (2026)	Peak position
Australian Albums (ARIA)	13
Austrian Albums (Ö3 Austria)	3
Belgian Albums (Ultratop Flanders)	32
Belgian Albums (Ultratop Wallonia)	3
Danish Vinyl Albums (Hitlisten)	9
Dutch Albums (Album Top 100)	24
Finnish Albums (Suomen virallinen lista)	14
French Albums (SNEP)	14
French Rock & Metal Albums (SNEP)	1
German Albums (Offizielle Top 100)	5
German Rock & Metal Albums (Offizielle Top 100)	2
Hungarian Physical Albums (MAHASZ)	6
Italian Albums (FIMI)	22
Japanese Albums (Oricon)	34
Japanese Digital Albums (Oricon)	27
Japanese Download Albums (Billboard Japan)	17
Japanese Rock Albums (Oricon)	5
Japanese Top Albums Sales (Billboard Japan)	22
New Zealand Albums (RMNZ)	30
Polish Albums (ZPAV)	7
Portuguese Albums (AFP)	24
Scottish Albums (Official Charts)	6
Spanish Albums (Promusicae)	17
Swedish Hard Rock Albums (Sverigetopplistan)	6
Swedish Physical Albums (Sverigetopplistan)	7
Swiss Albums (Schweizer Hitparade)	6
UK Albums (Official Charts)	27
UK Independent Albums (Official Charts)	5
UK Rock & Metal Albums (Official Charts)	2
US Billboard 200	41
US Independent Albums (Billboard)	6
US Top Rock & Alternative Albums (Billboard)	11

== Release history ==
Region	Date	Label	Format(s)
Worldwide	August 14, 2026	Nuclear Blast	CD, cassette, LP, digital
