= PMBR =

PMBR may refer to:

- Preliminary Multistate Bar Review, a bar review course provider owned by Kaplan, Inc.
- protective master boot record, a boot sector on a hard disk with an MS-DOS-compatible format partition table embedded in it which also has a GUID partition table (GPT). Its purpose is to protect the disk contents from accidental damage by programs which properly interpret the MS-DOS-format partition table but do not interpret the GPT--for example, the fdisk program of both MS-DOS and Linux.
- primary master boot record, also in reference to GPTs. Because the GPT scheme stores a copy of the table not only at logical block address (LBA) 1 but also on the last sectors of the disk, the one at LBA 1 would be the primary.
