= Front Toward Enemy (song) =

2026 single by Marilyn Manson

Single by Marilyn Manson

from the album One Assassination Under God – Chapter 2
- B-side: "Exit Wound"
- Released: July 17, 2026
- Genre: Industrial metal
- Length: 4:23
- Label: Nuclear Blast
- Songwriters: Tyler Bates; Marilyn Manson
- Producers: Bates; Manson

Marilyn Manson singles chronology
"Exit Wound" (2026)	"Front Toward Enemy" (2026)	"Unalive" (2026)

Music video
- "Front Toward Enemy" on YouTube

"Front Toward Enemy" is a song by American rock band Marilyn Manson. The track was written and produced by Tyler Bates and Marilyn Manson. It was released by Nuclear Blast as a digital download on July 17, 2026, as the second single from the band's thirteenth studio album, One Assassination Under God – Chapter 2. The song previously appeared as a b-side on the band's 2024 single "Raise the Red Flag".

== Composition and style ==
Like every track on One Assassination Under God – Chapter 2, the song was co-written and produced by Tyler Bates and Marilyn Manson. The phrase "Front Toward Enemy" is derived from the warning printed on the Claymore mine. Gregory Adams of Revolver said the song "near-immediately lunges into a punchy metal riff" and complimented Manson's "bruising rally cry" vocals. He called the track a "battle anthem", and compared it to "The Fight Song" from the band's 2000 album Holy Wood (In the Shadow of the Valley of Death). Next Mosh said the song retains the industrial sound of One Assassination Under God – Chapter 1.

== Release and promotion ==
"Front Toward Enemy" had previously been issued as the b-side on the limited edition CD single "Raise the Red Flag", a single from their 2024 album One Assassination Under God – Chapter 1. The song was released as the second single from One Assassination Under God – Chapter 2 on July 17, 2026. The two-track digital download and streaming single contained "Exit Wound", the first single from Chapter 2, as its b-side. The single was released on the same day a limited edition vinyl variant of Chapter 2, "the Claymore", was made available for pre-order.

=== Music video ===
The music video for the song was directed by Henri Alexander Levy, and was released on July 21. It features Manson performing on an all-white soundstage alongside young doppelgängers, who play drums and guitar.

== Critical reception ==
Revolver included it on their list of the week's best new single releases. They called the song "Confrontational as ever, and seething with FAFO energy", and said it "goes for the kill." They called it a "stomping, dirt-nasty bric-a-brac where Manson puffs himself up with devilish braggadocio ('I was too much for hell to swallow') before unloading on his enemies."

== Track listing ==
All songs written by Marilyn Manson and Tyler Bates.

1. "Front Toward Enemy" – 4:23
2. "Exit Wound" – 4:38
