= Host protected area =

Area of hard drive that is not visible to operating system

The host protected area (HPA) is an area of a hard drive or solid-state drive that is not normally visible to an operating system. It was first introduced in the ATA-4 standard CXV (T13) in 2001.

== How it works ==
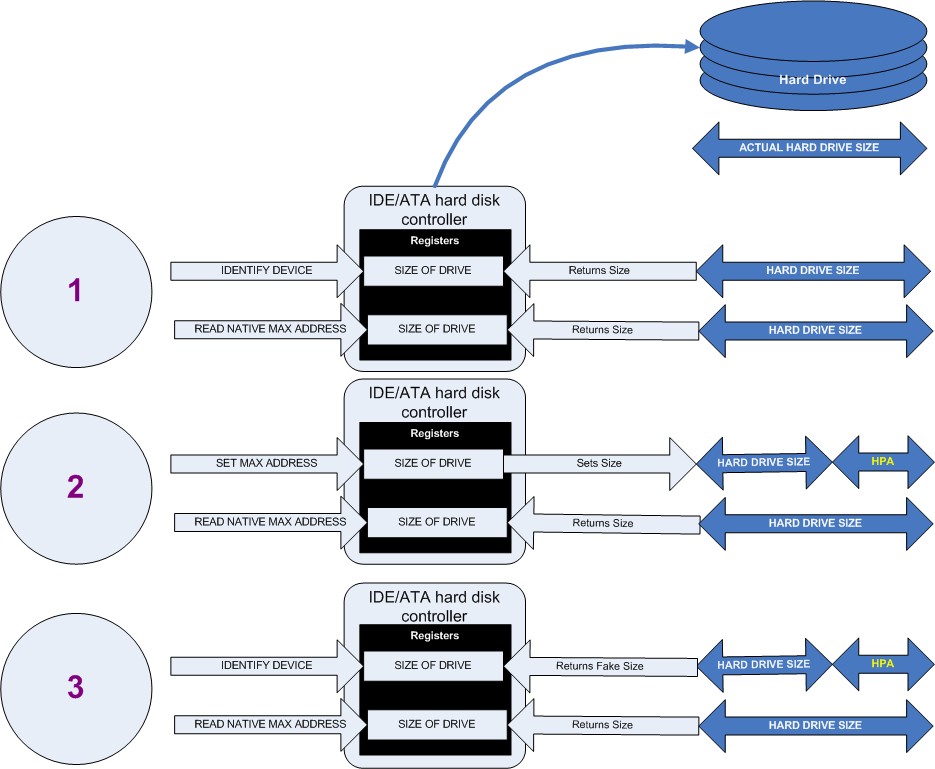
Creation of an HPA. The diagram shows how a host protected area (HPA) is created.: 1. IDENTIFY DEVICE returns the true size of the hard drive. READ NATIVE MAX ADDRESS returns the true size of the hard drive.; 2. SET MAX ADDRESS reduces the reported size of the hard drive. READ NATIVE MAX ADDRESS returns the true size of the hard drive. An HPA has been created.; 3. IDENTIFY DEVICE returns the now fake size of the hard drive. READ NATIVE MAX ADDRESS returns the true size of the hard drive, the HPA is in existence.

The IDE controller has registers that contain data that can be queried using ATA commands. The data returned gives information about the drive attached to the controller. There are three ATA commands involved in creating and using a host protected area. The commands are:

- IDENTIFY DEVICE
- SET MAX ADDRESS
- READ NATIVE MAX ADDRESS

Operating systems use the IDENTIFY DEVICE command to find out the addressable space of a hard drive. The IDENTIFY DEVICE command queries a particular register on the IDE controller to establish the size of a drive.

This register however can be changed using the SET MAX ADDRESS ATA command. If the value in the register is set to less than the actual hard drive size then effectively a host protected area is created. It is protected because the OS will work with only the value in the register that is returned by the IDENTIFY DEVICE command and thus will normally be unable to address the parts of the drive that lie within the HPA.

The HPA is useful only if other software or firmware (e.g. BIOS or UEFI) is able to use it. Software and firmware that are able to use the HPA are referred to as 'HPA aware'. The ATA command that these entities use is called READ NATIVE MAX ADDRESS. This command accesses a register that contains the true size of the hard drive. To use the area, the controlling HPA-aware program changes the value of the register read by IDENTIFY DEVICE to that found in the register read by READ NATIVE MAX ADDRESS. When its operations are complete, the register read by IDENTIFY DEVICE is returned to its original fake value.

== Use ==
- HPA can be used by various booting and diagnostic utilities, normally in conjunction with the BIOS. An example of this implementation is the Phoenix FirstBIOS, which uses Boot Engineering Extension Record (BEER) and Protected Area Run Time Interface Extension Services (PARTIES).
- HPA can also be used to store data that is deemed illegal and is thus of interest to government and police computer forensics teams.
- Some rootkits hide in the HPA to avoid being detected by anti-rootkit and antivirus software.
- Some NSA exploits use the HPA for application persistence.

== Identification ==
Identification of HPA on a hard drive can be achieved by a number of tools and methods:

- ATATool by Data Synergy
- EnCase by Guidance Software
- Forensic Toolkit by Access Data
- hdparm by Mark Lord
- The Sleuth Kit (free, open software) by Brian Carrier (HPA identification is currently only supported on Linux.)

== See also ==
- Device Configuration Overlay (DCO)
- GUID Partition Table (GPT)
- Master boot record (MBR)
