= Recovery Console =

Microsoft Windows feature

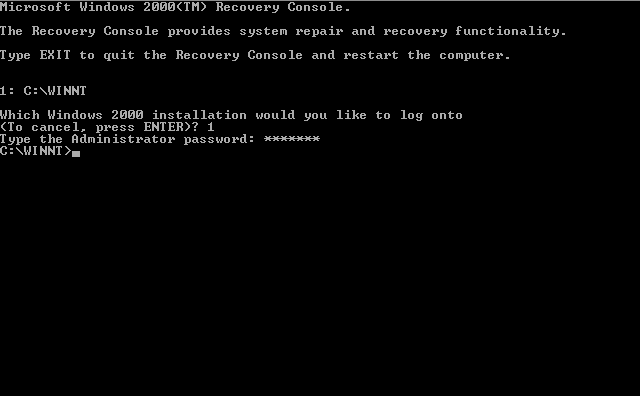
- The Windows 2000 Recovery Console selection, login, and command prompts
- Developer: Microsoft
- Release: February 17, 2000; 26 years ago
- Operating system: Windows 2000, Windows XP, Windows Server 2003
- Platform: IA-32, x86-64, Itanium
- Successor: Windows Recovery Environment
- Service name: CMDCONS
- Type: Command-line interpreter

The Recovery Console is a feature of the Windows 2000, Windows XP and Windows Server 2003 operating systems. It provides the means for administrators to perform a limited range of tasks using a command-line interface.

Its primary function is to enable administrators to recover from situations where Windows does not boot as far as presenting its graphical user interface. The recovery console is used to provide a way to access the hard drive in an emergency through the command prompt. The Recovery Console can be started from Windows 2000 / XP / 2003 Setup CD.

The Recovery Console can be accessed in two ways, either through the original installation media used to install Windows, or by installing it onto the hard drive and adding it to the NTLDR menu. However, the latter option is much more risky than the former one because it requires that the computer can boot to the point that NTLDR loads, or else the Recovery Console will not work at all.

== Abilities ==
The Recovery Console has a simple command-line interpreter (or CLI). Many of the available commands closely resemble the commands that are normally available in cmd.exe, namely attrib, copy, del, and so forth.

From the Recovery Console an administrator can:

- create and remove directories, and copy, erase, display, and rename files
- enable and disable services (which modifies the service control database in the registry, to take effect when the system is next bootstrapped)
- repair boot file, using the bootcfg command
- write a new master boot record to a disk, using the fixmbr command
- write a new volume boot record to a volume, using the fixboot command
- format volumes
- expand files from the compressed format in which they are stored on the installation CD-ROM
- perform a full chkdsk scan to repair corrupted disks and files, especially if the computer cannot be started properly

Filesystem access on the Recovery Console is by default severely limited. An administrator using the Recovery Console has only read-only access to all volumes except for the boot volume, and even on the boot volume only access to the root directory and to the Windows system directory (e.g. \WINNT). This can be changed by changing Security Policies to enable read/write access to the complete file system including copying files from removable media (i.e. floppy drives).

=== Commands ===
The following is a list of the Recovery Console internal commands:

- attrib
- batch
- bootcfg (introduced in Windows XP)
- cd
- chdir
- chkdsk
- cls
- copy
- del
- delete
- dir
- disable
- diskpart
- enable
- exit
- expand
- fixboot
- fixmbr
- format
- help
- listsvc
- logon
- map
- md
- mkdir
- more
- rd
- ren
- rename
- rmdir
- set (introduced in Windows XP)
- systemroot
- type

Although it appears in the list of commands available by using the help command, and in many articles about the Recovery Console (including those authored by Microsoft), the net command is not available. No protocol stacks are loaded, so there is no way to connect to a shared folder on a remote computer as implied.

== See also ==
- Emergency Repair Disk
- Comparison of command shells
