= System partition and boot partition =

Computing terms for disk partitions

The system partition and the boot partition (also known as the system volume and the boot volume) are computing terms for disk partitions of a hard disk drive or solid-state drive that must exist and be properly configured for a computer to operate. There are two different definitions for these terms: the common definition and the Microsoft definition.

== Common definition ==
In context of every operating system, except those developed by Microsoft, the system partition and the boot partition are defined as follows:

- The boot partition is a primary partition that contains the boot loader, a piece of software responsible for booting the operating system. For example, in the standard Linux directory layout (Filesystem Hierarchy Standard), boot files (such as the kernel, initrd, and boot loader GRUB) are mounted at /boot/. Despite Microsoft's radically different definition (see below), System Information, a utility app included in Windows NT family of operating systems, refers to it as "boot device".
- The system partition is the disk partition that contains the operating system folder, known as the system root. By default, in Linux, operating system files are mounted at / (the root directory).

In Linux, a single partition can be both a boot and a system partition if both /boot/ and the root directory are in the same partition.

== Microsoft definition ==
Since Windows NT 3.1 (the first version of Windows NT), Microsoft has defined the terms as follows:

- The system partition (or system volume) is a primary partition that contains the boot loader, a piece of software responsible for booting the operating system. This partition holds the boot sector and is marked active.
- The boot partition (or boot volume) is the disk partition that contains the operating system folder, known as the system root or %systemroot% in Windows NT.

Before Windows 7, the system and boot partitions were, by default, the same and were given the "C:" drive letter. Since Windows 7, however, Windows Setup creates, by default, a separate system partition that is not given an identifier and therefore is hidden. The boot partition is still given "C:" as its identifier. This configuration is suitable for running BitLocker, which requires a separate unencrypted system partition for booting. As of Windows 11, this nomenclature is still used by the "Disk Management" utility.

== Other examples ==
- UFS had defined the boot logical units.

== See also ==
- NTLDR
- Windows startup process
- Windows NT startup process
- Windows Vista startup process
- Windows To Go
