= Exit Wound (song) =

2026 single by Marilyn Manson

Single by Marilyn Manson

from the album One Assassination Under God – Chapter 2
- Released: June 12, 2026
- Genre: Industrial metal; gothic rock; glam rock
- Length: 4:38
- Label: Nuclear Blast
- Songwriters: Tyler Bates; Marilyn Manson
- Producers: Bates; Manson

Marilyn Manson singles chronology
"In the Air Tonight" (2025)	"Exit Wound" (2026)	"Front Toward Enemy" (2026)

Music video
- "Exit Wound" on YouTube

"Exit Wound" is a song by American rock band Marilyn Manson. It was released by Nuclear Blast as a one-track digital download on June 12, 2026, as the lead single from their thirteenth studio album, One Assassination Under God – Chapter 2. An accompanying music video, directed by Rizz and Gretchen Lanham, was released the same day.

== Composition and style ==
Like the rest of parent album One Assassination Under God – Chapter 2, it was co-written and produced by Tyler Bates and Marilyn Manson. Geca Flores of Parade described the song as an anthemic mix of industrial metal, gothic rock and glam rock that picks up where the band's previous album, One Assassination Under God – Chapter 1 (2024) left off. Gregory Adams of Revolver similarly called the song a "seething glam-spiked goth-rock anthem".

== Release and promotion ==
The song was released as a one-track digital download and on streaming platforms on June 12, 2026. The music video was released the same day, and was directed by Rizz and Gretchen Lanham. The video consists mostly of the band performing in a live setting. The live band includes Manson, guitarists Piggy D. and Nick Annis, bassist Tim Sköld, and drummer Gil Sharone.

On July 17, 2026, the song was also released as a B-side for the "Front Toward Enemy" single.

== Critical reception ==
Revolver included it on their list of the week's best new single releases. They said the song's lyrics show Manson being a "veritable downer Doctor Dolittle", noting the references to leeches and vultures. However, they went on to say it was Manson who "delivers the beastliest blow by song's end, as he lets out an animalistic scream above a brooding fracas of slinky hi-hat grooves and see-sawing industrial riffage. There's a line in here about swallowing a grenade, perhaps an unintended allusion to how the rest of the record could pop off big when it lands in the summer."

Blunt Magazine said the song "suggests a direct continuation of the world established" on Chapter 1, saying that Manson has chosen to expand upon the "heavier, atmospheric" portion of that album. They commended Manson's recent output for being "increasingly focused on long form storytelling". Blabbermouth.net called the song "dark, cinematic, and unrelentingly visceral", saying it continues the creative resurgence that began with Chapter 1 by "pushing deeper into unsettling atmosphere, crushing industrial textures, and haunting melodic tension." Spotlight Report also said the song continues a creative resurgence for the band.

Umusic Digital said the track contained the band's "most recognizable hallmarks, with dense guitars and a marked influence of industrial and gothic rock from the eighties. That is to say, once again the American artist and his band develop their dark and suffocating universe from the personal perspective that has always characterized them." Metal Planet Music called the song "classic Marilyn Manson", saying it feels like "a true continuation of the previous album". Their writer said the song was "eerie at times, loud, aggressive, softer in parts". They praised the bass guitar work in the verse and the "raucous" electric guitar riffs in the chorus and outro. They described the song as "Comfortingly familiar, and equally as compelling, you're just waiting for the overdrive of the guitar to crack through the speaker cone and deliver that darkness that all [of the band's] fans crave. Predictable or not, there it is."

== Charts ==
Chart (2026)	Peak position
US Hot Hard Rock Songs (Billboard)	21
US Mainstream Rock (Billboard)	25
