= Microsoft basic data partition =

Aspect of a computer disk file system

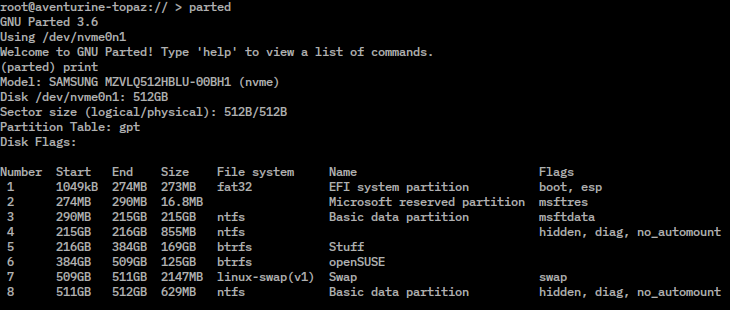
Example of Microsoft basic data partitions within a GUID Partition Table (GPT). GNU Parted marked one with msftdata flag (visible), the other one is a Windows Recovery Environment partition (hidden)

Microsoft-defined GPT attribute flags for BDPs
Bit number	Meaning
60	The volume is read-only and may not be mounted read-write.
62	The volume is hidden.
63	The operating system may not automatically assign a drive letter to the volume.

In Microsoft operating systems, when using basic disk partitioned with GUID Partition Table (GPT) layout, a basic data partition (BDP) is any partition identified with Globally Unique Identifier (GUID) of EBD0A0A2-B9E5-4433-87C0-68B6B72699C7.

According to Microsoft, the basic data partition is the equivalent to master boot record (MBR) partition types 0x06 (FAT16B), 0x07 (NTFS or exFAT), and 0x0B (FAT32). In practice, it is equivalent to 0x01 (FAT12), 0x04 (FAT16), 0x0C (FAT32 with logical block addressing), and 0x0E (FAT16 with logical block addressing) types as well.

A basic data partition can be formatted with any file system, although most commonly BDPs are formatted with the NTFS, exFAT, or FAT32 file systems. To programmatically determine which file system a BDP contains, Microsoft specifies that one should inspect the BIOS Parameter Block that is contained in the BDP's Volume Boot Record.

When a Microsoft operating system converts a GPT-partitioned basic disk to a dynamic disk, all BDPs are combined and converted to a single Logical Disk Manager data partition identified with GUID AF9B60A0-1431-4F62-BC68-3311714A69AD. This is analogous to the conversion from partition types 0x01, 0x04, 0x06, 0x07, 0x0B, 0x0C, and 0x0E to partition type 0x42 on MBR partitioned disks.

Linux used the same partition type GUID for basic data partition as Windows prior to introduction of a Linux specific Data Partition GUID 0FC63DAF-8483-4772-8E79-3D69D8477DE4.

== See also ==
- Disk partitioning
- EFI system partition (ESP), a reserved partition on GPT disk
- Microsoft Reserved Partition (MSR), a reserved partition on GPT disk
