= Configuresoft =

American software company

Configuresoft logo

Configuresoft, Inc. was an American software company, best known for their Enterprise Configuration Manager software. In May 2009, EMC Corporation announced the acquisition of Configuresoft.

In 1999 by E. Alexander Goldstein (CEO), Dr Dennis Moreau (CTO), Louis Woodhill (Chairman) and Alan Sage (VP, Worldwide Sales) formed a company which they named Fundamental Software, Inc. Based in Woodland Park, Colorado, the company was founded to purchase the intellectual property rights to London-based company Serverware Group plc's Enterprise Configuration Manager network systems management product (with the British company taking a stake in the new start-up as part of the deal).

In January 2001 the company changed its name to Configuresoft, Inc. in order to differentiate it from a number of other software houses with the Fundamental Software name.

In April 2004 Configuresoft, having outgrown its offices in Woodland Park, moved to Colorado Springs, where it became one of the larger employers in the area.

In July 2006 Goldstein retired and Mark Ruport was named as the new CEO, holding the position until February 2009 when Alex Goldstein returned to the role.

Prior to the EMC acquisition, Configuresoft's customer base included Citigroup, ExxonMobil, Intel Corporation and Qwest Communications, as well as several governmental agencies in the United Kingdom, including the Ministry of Defence, the Department for Children, Schools and Families and the Department for Work and Pensions.

== Awards ==
=== 2008 ===
- System Configuration Management "All-Star First Team" - Enterprise Management Associates

=== 2006 ===
- Best of Tech-Ed Winner
- Best of MMS Winner
- LinuxWorld Finalist – Best Security Solution

=== 2005 ===
- Best of Tech-Ed and Best of Tech-Ed Europe - Systems Management
