= Bootcfg =

bootcfg
- Developer: Microsoft
- Initial release: October 25, 2001; 24 years ago
- Operating system: Microsoft Windows
- Type: Command
- License: Proprietary commercial software
- Website: docs.microsoft.com/en-us/windows-server/administration/windows-commands/bootcfg

In computing, bootcfg is a command on Microsoft Windows NT-based operating systems which acts as a wrapper for editing the boot.ini file.

== Overview ==
The command is used to configure, query, or change Boot.ini file settings. A similar command exists in the Recovery Console for repairing or rebuilding boot configuration files.

Though NTLDR and boot.ini are no longer used to boot Windows Vista and later versions of Windows NT, they ship with the bootcfg utility regardless. This is to handle boot.ini in the case that a multi-boot configuration with previous versions of Windows exists and needs troubleshooting from within the later operating system.

Windows Vista and later versions will warn users who run bootcfg that BCDEdit is the correct command to modify its booting options.

== Syntax ==
The command-syntax is:

bootcfg <parameter> [arguments...]

=== Parameters ===
- addsw – Add operating system load options
- copy – Make a copy of an existing boot entry
- dbg1394 – Configures 1394 port debugging
- debug – Add or changes debug settings
- default – Specify the default operating system entry
- delete – Deletes an operating system entry
- ems – Add or change settings for redirection of the Emergency Management Services console
- query – Query and displays [boot loader] and [operating systems] section entries
- raw – Add operating system load options
- rmsw – Remove operating system load options
- timeout – Change operating system time-out value
