= ATATool =

Windows software to display ATA disk information

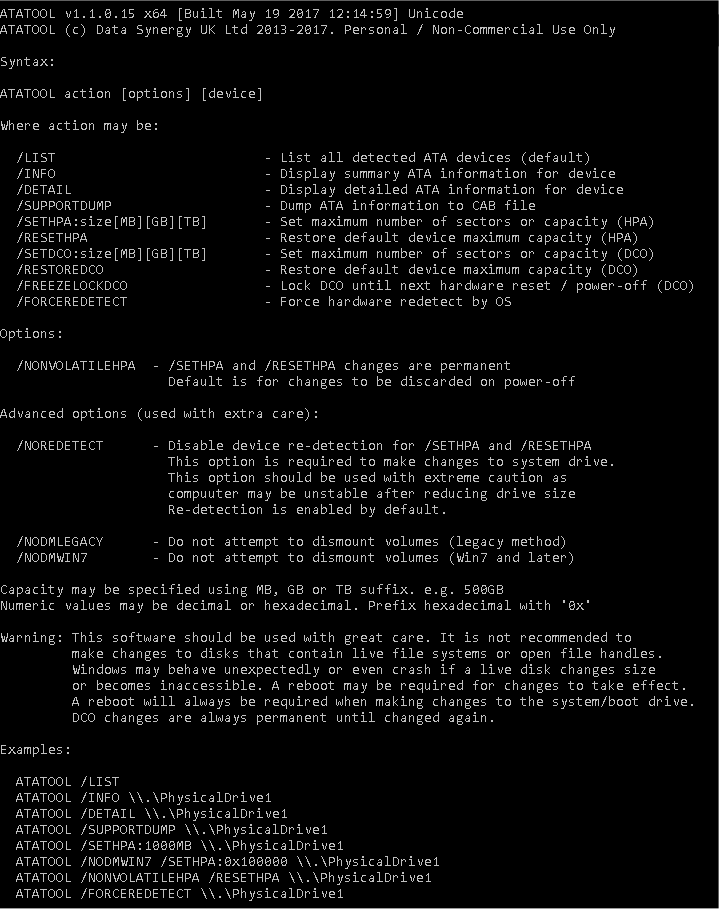
- ATATool for Windows
- Stable release: 1.4.0.210 / 1 April 2023; 3 years ago
- Written in: C
- Operating system: Windows
- Available in: English
- License: Copyright
- Website: https://www.forensicinternals.com

ATATool is software that is used to display and modify ATA disk information from a Microsoft Windows environment. The software is typically used to manage host protected area (HPA) and device configuration overlay (DCO) features and is broadly similar to the hdparm for Linux. The software can also be used to generate and sometimes repair bad sectors. Recent versions include support for DCO restore and freeze operations, HPA security (password) operations and simulated bad sectors. ATATool is no longer available for personal download and can only be used for "professional users" like for security researchers.

== Usage examples ==
ATATool must be run with administrator privileges. On Windows Vista and later it requires an elevated-privileges command prompt (see User Account Control). The target drive must be connected to a physical disk controller. The software will not work when using a hard drive through an external connection like USB or any external hard drive.

Display detected Hard Drives:

ATATOOL /LIST

Display information on Hard Drive 1:

ATATOOL /INFO \\.\PhysicalDrive1

Set a volatile HPA of 50GB on Hard Drive 1 (HPA will be lost after a power cycle):

ATATOOL /SETHPA:50GB \\.\PhysicalDrive1

Set a permanent HPA of 50GB on Hard Drive 1 (HPA will still stay after power cycles):

ATATOOL /NONVOLATILEHPA /SETHPA:50GB \\.\PhysicalDrive1

Remove permanent HPA on Hard Drive 1:

ATATOOL /NONVOLATILEHPA /RESETHPA \\.\PhysicalDrive1

Set DCO to 100GB on Hard Drive 1:

ATATOOL /SETDCO:100GB \\.\PhysicalDrive1

Remove DCO of 100GB on Hard Drive 1:

ATATOOL /RESTOREDCO:100GB \\.\PhysicalDrive1

Make sector 5 bad:

ATATOOL /BADECC:5 \\.\PhysicalDrive1

Make sector 5 not bad:

ATATOOL /FIXECC:5 \\.\PhysicalDrive1

Make sector 10 bad and then not bad again (alternative method):

ATATOOL /BADECCLONG:10 \\.\PhysicalDrive1
ATATOOL /FIXECCLONG:10 \\.\PhysicalDrive1

== Warning ==
Using ATATool can permanently change the disk configuration, may result in permanent data loss by making some sectors of the disk inaccessible. Please use ATATool at your own risk.

== See also ==
- hdparm
- Host protected area (HPA)
- Device configuration overlay (DCO)
