= Hdparm =

Linux command-line program for modifying hard disk drive parameters

hdparm
- Developer: Mark Lord
- Stable release: 9.65 / 7 September 2022; 3 years ago
- Operating system: Linux
- Size: 134 kB
- Type: Utility software
- License: BSD license
- Website: sourceforge.net/projects/hdparm/

hdparm is a command line program for Linux to set and view ATA hard disk drive hardware parameters and test performance. It can set parameters such as drive caches, sleep mode, power management, acoustic management, and DMA settings. GParted and Parted Magic both include hdparm.

Changing hardware parameters from suboptimal conservative defaults to their optimal settings can improve performance greatly. For example, turning on DMA can, in some instances, double or triple data throughput. There is, however, no reliable method for determining the optimal settings for a given controller-drive combination, except careful trial and error.

Depending on the given parameters, hdparm can cause computer crashes or render the data on the disk inaccessible.

== Usage examples ==
hdparm has to be run with special privileges, otherwise it will either not be found or the requested actions will not be executed properly.

Display information of the hard drive:

sudo hdparm -I /dev/sda

Turn on DMA for the first hard drive:

sudo hdparm -d1 /dev/sda

Test device read performance speed (-t for timing buffered disk reads) of the first hard drive:

sudo hdparm -t /dev/sda

Enable energy saving spindown after inactivity (24*5=120 seconds):

sudo hdparm -S 24 /dev/sda

To retain hdparm settings after a software reset, run:

sudo hdparm -K 1 /dev/sda

Enable read-ahead:

sudo hdparm -A 1 /dev/sda

Set a volatile HPA of 10000000 sectors on the first hard drive (HPA will be lost after a power cycle):

hdparm -N 10000000 /dev/sda

Set a permanent HPA of 10000000 sectors on the first hard drive (HPA will still stay after power cycles):

hdparm -N p10000000 /dev/sda

Change its acoustic management, at the cost of read/write performance (some hard drives and SSDs might ignore this setting though.):

sudo hdparm -M 128 /dev/sda

If the disk synchronisation intervals are too short, then even small amounts of data will be written to disk which can have severe consequences for its lifespan. The better way would be to collect small data into bigger chunks and wait until the chunk is big enough to be written to disk.

Current web browsers like Chrome write regularly small chunks when browsing in order not to lose any important data when the application crashes. However, this lets the disk spin very often as the drive repeatedly needs to unleash and then park its heads. The generated noises can be thus regarded as distracting by the user. To circumvent this issue, the user can switch the drive to the lowest degree of power management (next value, 255, turns power management off):

hdparm -B 254 /dev/sda

Additionally, changing the value of /proc/sys/vm/dirty_expire_centisecs can have an effect on the performance. It sets the flush interval when dirty pages are written to disk.

These commands are only effective in the long-run if the user makes the changes persistent. However, the settings the user can set via hdparm are reverted each time the system is rebooted. Therefore, it might be wise to restore the personal settings upon boot. An appropriate place that exists in most Linux distributions is the /etc/rc.local script.

== See also ==
- ATATool for Windows
