= Windows Setup =

Installer for Microsoft Windows

Language select before installation in Windows 11 (before 26 January 2024 update and 24H2)

Expanding files during installation in Windows 11 (before 26 January 2024 update and 24H2)

Windows Setup is an installer that prepares a computer for a Microsoft Windows installation by allowing the user to pick installation settings (modifying partitions if necessary) and copying the files to the drive.

Early versions of Windows required an existing, compatible version of MS-DOS for installation. The Windows NT family, from 3.1 through 5.0 featured text-based installation that prompted users to a GUI wizard in the final steps. The 9x family installer was similar to NT despite it being MS-DOS-based. Additionally, it did not need preinstalled DOS as a requirement. With the release of Windows NT 6.0 (which Windows Vista and Windows Server 2008 are based on), Microsoft introduced a fully graphical setup environment and UEFI support (partial in Windows Vista and 7, full UEFI support on Windows 8 onwards). The new graphical setup environment is based on Windows Preinstallation Environment.

== Windows 1.x and Windows 2.x ==
The installation of Windows 1.0, Windows 2.0, Windows 2.1 requires that a compatible version of MS-DOS is installed. The user must specify any hardware such as mice or printers during installation. After the installation, Windows was to be started either manually by typing "WIN.COM" at the command prompt, or configured for automatic startup by adding WIN.COM to the end of AUTOEXEC.BAT.

== Windows 3.x ==
The installation of Windows 3.0, Windows 3.1 and Windows 3.2 requires that a compatible DOS operating system is already installed. The installer attempts to detect network cards, mice, and other hardware on its own but will rely on the user to specify hardware if it cannot find them. After the installation, Windows was to be started either manually by typing "WIN.COM" at the command prompt, or configured for automatic startup by adding WIN.COM to the end of AUTOEXEC.BAT.

== Windows 9x ==
Windows 95, 98, and Me utilize a similar setup process, which does not require MS-DOS to be already installed. The setup application can be launched from a DOS environment (typically a DOS boot disk, also containing utilities such as fdisk to conduct disk partitioning), or from an existing Windows installation for in-place upgrades. If launched from DOS, a stub application first bootstraps a minimal environment based upon Windows 3.1, which is then used to launch a graphical wizard to begin the first phase of the installation process. In any case, after initial configuration and the copying of files to the selected installation folder, the computer then reboots into the installed OS to conduct the second phase, including hardware detection, driver installation, and post-install housekeeping before installation is complete.

== Windows NT ==
=== Before Windows Vista/Windows Server 2008 ===
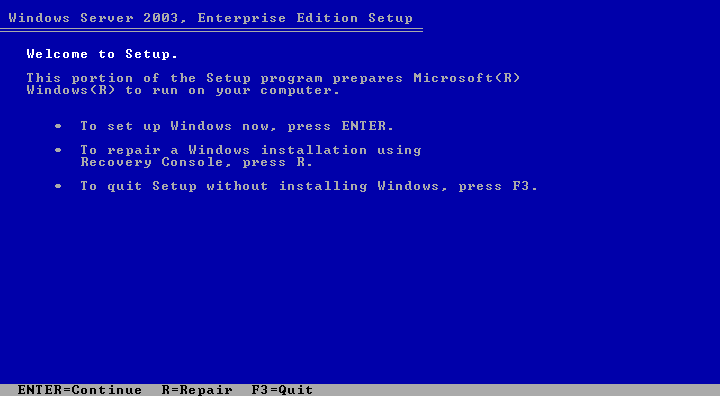
The opening screen of the setup for Windows Server 2003

The setup process introduced with Windows NT 3.1 remained in effect until the release of Windows Vista. The general process is:

1. The user starts the installation process, either by booting off the installation media, running the MS-DOS installer from MS-DOS, or running the Windows installer from an existing Windows install.
  - The MS-DOS installer (WINNT.EXE) is used to bootstrap the first stage of installation by generating a series of three boot disks, which are used to launch the installer if the system does not support booting from the CD. A command line switch can also be used to copy the installation files to the hard drive and boot the installer from it directly.
  - The Windows installer presents an agreement and asks for the product key right at the beginning to upgrade Windows, then it copies files to the hard disk, and reboot to the setup from the hard disk in order to continue to the next step.
2. If the installation process started from booting off the media, or from the Windows installer, the boot loader loads the kernel, various hardware and file-system drivers.
  - If any third-party drivers are needed in order to detect an SCSI or RAID system, setup pauses and requests the supply of a driver on a floppy disk. See F6 disk.
3. If the installation process started from booting off the media, the user is then presented with a text-based interface which gives three options 1) install Windows, 2) repair an existing installation, or 3) quit setup.
4. If the user decides to install Windows, they are presented with an agreement that must be accepted for Setup to continue. Prior to Windows 2000, the user was required to scroll to the bottom of the agreement before they were permitted to agree.
5. Unless it is an upgrade, the user must create or select a partition, then a filesystem (either NTFS or FAT). If either of these file systems is already present and there is no version of Windows already on the disk, it is also possible to leave the current file system intact.
6. The hard disk is checked for errors and space requirements, then, if it passes the check, Windows will be installed.
7. After the text-based phase of Setup is finished, the computer reboots and starts a graphical phase of setup from the hard disk, prompting the user to reinsert the installation media, to enter the product key, and then it continues copying files and drivers.

All versions of Windows NT up to Windows Server 2003, except for Windows XP Home Edition, prompt the user to enter an Administrator password.

On Windows 2000, Windows XP and Windows Server 2003, the Recovery Console is included to repair damaged installations. It allows the user to repair disk and boot record errors, and copy missing or corrupted files to the destination folders.

On Windows 2000, Windows XP and Windows Server 2003, the Windows Setup process is first started from setupldr.bin, which is a modified version of NTLDR.

=== After Windows Vista/Windows Server 2008 ===
Windows Vista, Windows Server 2008, and subsequent operating systems all utilize Windows Preinstallation Environment (Windows PE) as the installation environment. Windows PE features a graphical user interface with mouse support from the beginning, rather than requiring a text-only phase as in previous versions. The concept of F6 disks has been improved to provide support for computers without floppy drives; the loading of drivers from CD-ROMs and USB flash drives is now supported. Support for installing Windows onto FAT partitions has been dropped; Windows must be installed onto an NTFS partition.

==== Process ====
1. The user inserts a disc or USB flash drive which contains the PE environment and installation files, then boots off of it.
2. The user selects language, region and keyboard preferences.
3. The user enters a Windows product key to activate it, though this step can be skipped in most cases.
4. The user accepts a license agreement.
5. The user chooses where to install Windows. A list of drives and their partitions are shown. The user picks one to install Windows on, and the user can make new partitions, delete them or load any hardware drivers if necessary. The user is notified if there are potential problems with their install location or if they cannot install on that location.
6. Setup begins to expand Windows files using a WIM image (aka install.wim). If the user has picked to upgrade from a current install of Windows (e.g. Windows 7 to 10), the files and applications will be transferred.
7. If booting from the installation disk, the bootloader is installed (in the case of Windows Vista and above, this would be BOOTMGR). This is left untouched if upgrading.
8. The system is restarted into a user setup (OOBE) where the user can make a new user and finish setting up Windows.

=== Windows 8 and later ===
Windows 8 introduces a new secondary installer known as the Upgrade Assistant, replacing Windows Setup for upgrade installations. Designed to be simpler and faster than previous installation methods, it analyses the system's hardware and software for compatibility with Windows 8, allows the user to purchase, download, and install the operating system, and migrate files and settings from the previous Windows installation in the case of a clean install. Windows Setup is still used when booting from installation media. On Windows 10, a sister program to Upgrade Assistant known as "Media Creation Tool" was introduced, which is used to download the Windows OS files and generate ISO images or USB boot media.

In January 2024, Microsoft began to replace Windows Setup on the Windows 11 boot media with a revamped version based on the UI of Upgrade Assistant. Microsoft stated that the new process would maintain all advanced features available in the existing setup process.
