= Unalive (song) =

Single by Marilyn Manson

from the album One Assassination Under God – Chapter 2
- Released: August 14, 2026
- Length: 4:56
- Label: Nuclear Blast
- Songwriters: Marilyn Manson; Tyler Bates
- Producers: Manson; Bates

Marilyn Manson singles chronology
"Front Toward Enemy" (2026)	"Unalive" (2026)

Music video
- "Unalive" on YouTube

"Unalive" is a song by American rock band Marilyn Manson. It was released on August 14, 2026, as the third single from their thirteenth studio album, One Assassination Under God – Chapter 2 (2026). The song was written and produced by Marilyn Manson and Tyler Bates, with drums performed by Gil Sharone. Anthony Silva directed its music video, which was released on August 14, 2026, the same date the album was released.

== Composition and style ==
"Unalive" is the first song on One Assassination Under God – Chapter 2, and was co-written and co-produced by Marilyn Manson and Tyler Bates. It was recorded at Bates's The Abattoir recording studio in Los Angeles sometime between April 2023 and April 2024, with drums performed by Gil Sharone.

Manson said the song "sets the tone for where Chapter 2 is going to take you. Musically, it makes it clear that Chapter 1 was about rebirth and Chapter 2 is about vengeance". He said the track's lyrical content was inspired by his childhood bible studies, and the grammatical "absurdity that you would replace words about death by an antonym, or the prefix 'un' with the word 'alive'. But I chose to manifest it for myself here as a magic word like abracadabra. This song for me works like a nursery rhyme or a spell. It's an incantation that conjures who I knew I would need to become, who I am now."

Sonic Perspectives said the song expands on the band's "signature dark, cinematic vision". Revolver sarcastically said the track continued the "grand rock and roll tradition" of songs providing a step-by-step guide to a new dance craze. While referencing songs such as "Cool Jerk", "The Twist", and "Time Warp", they noted the lyric: "Stand in a circle, take out your sword / Now stab to your right / Go around in a daisy chain until you're all unalive."

== Release and promotion ==
The song is the third single from the album; a music video was released on August 14, 2026, the same day the parent album was released. The music video was directed by Anthony Silva.

== Music video ==
The video for "Unalive" takes place in the same abandoned farm house from the music video for "One Assassination Under God". It also features the same car and tree seen in that video. The video for "Unalive" begins with Manson in the basement of the house, covered in dirt and lying in a magic circle. He destroys the circle, crawls up a flight of stairs and lies in front of a television displaying noise. After regaining his composure and while brandishing a sword, Manson screams "I want your death / Your whole death / And nothing but your death", and transforms into a bejewelled horned deity. The video ends with the deity outside while the house, tree and car burn down.

== Credits and personnel ==
Credits adapted from the liner notes of One Assassination Under God – Chapter 2.

- Tyler Bates – composition, guitars, bass, keyboards, recording and production
- Will Borza – mastering
- Robert Carranza – recording and mixing
- Marilyn Manson – composition, vocals and production
- Gil Sharone – drums
- Howie Weinberg – mastering
