= GUID Partition Table =

Computer data storage partitioning standard

The layout of a disk with the GUID Partition Table. In this example, each logical block is 512 bytes in size and each entry has 128 bytes. The corresponding partition entries are assumed to be located in LBA 2–33. Negative LBAs indicate a position from the end of the volume, with −1 being the last addressable block.

The Globally Unique Identifier (GUID) Partition Table is a standard for the layout of partition tables of a physical computer storage device, such as a hard disk drive or solid-state drive. It is part of the Unified Extensible Firmware Interface (UEFI) standard.

It has several advantages over master boot record (MBR) partition tables, such as support for more than four primary partitions and 64-bit rather than 32-bit logical block addresses (LBA) for blocks on a storage device. The larger LBA size supports larger disks.

Some BIOSes support GPT partition tables as well as MBR partition tables, in order to support larger disks than MBR partition tables can support.

GPT uses universally unique identifiers (UUIDs), which are also known as globally unique identifiers (GUIDs), to identify partitions and partition types.

All modern personal computer operating systems support GPT. Some, including macOS and Microsoft Windows on the x86 architecture, support booting from GPT partitions only on systems with EFI firmware, but FreeBSD and most Linux distributions can boot from GPT partitions on systems with either the BIOS or the EFI firmware interface.

== History ==
The Master Boot Record (MBR) partitioning scheme, widely used since the early 1980s, had limitations when it came to modern hardware. The available size for block addresses and related information is limited to 32 bits. For hard disks with 512‑byte sectors, the MBR partition table entries allow a maximum size of 2 TiB (2^{32} × 512‑bytes) or 2.20 TB (2.20 × 10^{12} bytes).

In the late 1990s, Intel developed a new partition table format as part of what eventually became the Unified Extensible Firmware Interface (UEFI). The GUID Partition Table is specified in chapter 5 of the UEFI 2.11 specification. GPT uses 64 bits for logical block addresses, allowing a maximum disk size of 2^{64} sectors. For disks with 512‑byte sectors, the maximum size is 8 ZiB (2^{64} × 512‑bytes) or 9.44 ZB (9.44 × 10^{21} bytes). For disks with 4,096‑byte sectors the maximum size is 64 ZiB (2^{64} × 4,096‑bytes) or 75.6 ZB (75.6 × 10^{21} bytes).

In 2010, hard-disk manufacturers introduced drives with 4,096‑byte sectors (Advanced Format). For compatibility with legacy hardware and software, those drives include an emulation technology (512e) that presents 512‑byte sectors to the entity accessing the hard drive, despite their underlying 4,096‑byte physical sectors. Performance could be degraded on write operations, when the drive is forced to perform two read-modify-write operations to satisfy a single misaligned 4,096‑byte write operation. Since April 2014, enterprise-class drives without emulation technology (4K native) have been available on the market.

Readiness of the support for 4 KB logical sectors within operating systems differs among their types, vendors and versions. For example, Microsoft Windows supports 4K native drives since Windows 8 and Windows Server 2012 (both released in 2012) in UEFI.

== Features ==
MBR vs. GPT partitioning and boot sequence visualized (systems using BIOS firmware). See GRUB2.

Like MBR, GPT uses logical block addressing (LBA) in place of the historical cylinder-head-sector (CHS) addressing. The protective MBR is stored at LBA 0, and the GPT header is in LBA 1. The GPT header has a pointer to the partition table (Partition Entry Array), which is typically at LBA 2. Each entry in the partition table has the same size, which is 128 or 256 or 512, etc., bytes; typically this size is 128 bytes. The UEFI specification stipulates that a minimum of 16,384 bytes, regardless of sector size, are allocated for the Partition Entry Array. Thus, on a disk with 512-byte sectors, at least 32 sectors are used for the Partition Entry Array, and the first usable block is at LBA 34 or higher, while on a 4,096-byte sector disk, at least 4 sectors are used for the Partition Entry Array, and the first usable block is at LBA 6 or higher. In addition to the primary GPT header and Partition Entry Array, stored at the beginning of the disk, there is a backup GPT header and Partition Entry Array, stored at the end of the disk. The backup GPT header must be at the last block on the disk (LBA -1) and the backup Partition Entry Array is placed between the end of the last partition and the last block.

== MBR variants ==
=== Protective MBR (LBA 0) ===
For limited backward compatibility, the space of the legacy Master Boot Record (MBR) is still reserved in the GPT specification, but it is now used in a way that prevents MBR-based disk utilities from misrecognizing and possibly overwriting GPT disks. This is referred to as a protective MBR.

A single partition of type EEh, encompassing the entire GPT drive (where "entire" actually means as much of the drive as can be represented in an MBR), is indicated and identifies it as GPT. Operating systems and tools which cannot read GPT disks will generally recognize the disk as containing one partition of unknown type and no empty space, and will typically refuse to modify the disk unless the user explicitly requests and confirms the deletion of this partition. This minimizes accidental erasures. Furthermore, GPT-aware OSes may check the protective MBR and if the enclosed partition type is not of type EEh or if there are multiple partitions defined on the target device, the OS may refuse to manipulate the partition table.

If the actual size of the disk exceeds the maximum partition size representable using the legacy 32-bit LBA entries in the MBR partition table, the recorded size of this partition is clipped at the maximum, thereby ignoring the rest of the disk. This amounts to a maximum reported size of 2 TiB, assuming a disk with 512 bytes per sector (see 512e). It would result in 16 TiB with 4 KiB sectors (4Kn), but since many older operating systems and tools are hard coded for a sector size of 512 bytes or are limited to 32-bit calculations, exceeding the 2 TiB limit could cause compatibility problems.

=== Hybrid MBR (LBA 0 + GPT) ===
In operating systems that support GPT-based boot through BIOS services rather than EFI, the first sector may also still be used to store the first stage of the bootloader code, but modified to recognize GPT partitions. The bootloader in the MBR must not assume a sector size of 512 bytes.

== Partition table header (LBA 1) ==
GPT header format
Offset	Length	Contents
0 (0x00)	8 bytes	Signature ("EFI PART", 45h 46h 49h 20h 50h 41h 52h 54h or 0x5452415020494645ULL (Note: Adding ULL suffix to an integer constant makes it of type unsigned long long int.) on little-endian machines)
8 (0x08)	4 bytes	Revision number of header - 1.0 (00h 00h 01h 00h) for UEFI 2.10
12 (0x0C)	4 bytes	Header size in little endian (in bytes, usually 5Ch 00h 00h 00h or 92 bytes)
16 (0x10)	4 bytes	CRC-32 of header (offset +0 to +0x5B) in little endian, with this field zeroed during calculation
20 (0x14)	4 bytes	Reserved; must be zero
24 (0x18)	8 bytes	Current LBA (location of this header copy)
32 (0x20)	8 bytes	Backup LBA (location of the other header copy)
40 (0x28)	8 bytes	First usable LBA for partitions (primary partition table last LBA + 1)
48 (0x30)	8 bytes	Last usable LBA for partitions (secondary partition table first LBA − 1)
56 (0x38)	16 bytes	Disk GUID in little endian (Note: GUIDs are structured in little endian format, but appear as mixed endian, due to a byte array being used to store the last eight bytes.)
72 (0x48)	8 bytes	Starting LBA of array of partition entries (usually 2 for compatibility)
80 (0x50)	4 bytes	Number of partition entries in array
84 (0x54)	4 bytes	Size of a single partition entry (usually 80h or 128)
88 (0x58)	4 bytes	CRC-32 of partition entries array in little endian
92 (0x5C)	*	Reserved; must be zeroes for the rest of the block (420 bytes for a sector size of 512 bytes; but can be more with larger sector sizes)

The partition table header defines the usable blocks on the disk. It also defines the number and size of the partition entries that make up the partition table (offsets 80 and 84 in the table).

== Partition entries (LBA 2–33) ==
GUID partition entry format
Offset	Length	Contents
0 (0x00)	16 bytes	Partition type GUID (little endian)
16 (0x10)	16 bytes	Unique partition GUID (little endian)
32 (0x20)	8 bytes	First LBA (little endian)
40 (0x28)	8 bytes	Last LBA (inclusive, usually odd)
48 (0x30)	8 bytes	Attribute flags (e.g. bit 60 denotes read-only)
56 (0x38)	72 bytes	Partition name (36 UTF-16LE code units)

After the primary header and before the backup header, the Partition Entry Array describes partitions, using a minimum size of 128 bytes for each entry block. The starting location of the array on disk, and the size of each entry, are given in the GPT header. The first 16 bytes of each entry designate the partition type's globally unique identifier (GUID). For example, the GUID for an EFI system partition is C12A7328-F81F-11D2-BA4B-00A0C93EC93B. The second 16 bytes are a GUID unique to the partition. Then follow the starting and ending 64 bit LBAs, partition attributes, and the 36 character (max.) Unicode partition name. As is the nature and purpose of GUIDs and as per RFC 4122, no central registry is needed to ensure the uniqueness of the GUID partition type designators.

The 64-bit partition table attributes are shared between 48-bit common attributes for all partition types, and 16-bit type-specific attributes:

Partition attributes
Bit	Content
0	Platform required (required by the computer to function properly, OEM partition for example, disk partitioning utilities must preserve the partition as is)
1	EFI firmware should ignore the content of the partition and not try to read from it
2	Legacy BIOS bootable (equivalent to active flag (typically bit 7 set) at offset +0h in partition entries of the MBR partition table)
3–47	Reserved for future use
48–63	Defined and used by the individual partition type

Microsoft defines the type-specific attributes for basic data partition as:

Basic data partition attributes
Bit	Content
60	Read-only
61	Shadow copy (of another partition)
62	Hidden
63	No drive letter (i.e. do not automount)

Google defines the type-specific attributes for ChromeOS kernel as:

ChromeOS kernel partition attributes
Bit	Content
56	Successful boot flag
55–52	Tries remaining
51–48	Priority (15: highest, 1: lowest, 0: not bootable)

== Operating-system support ==
=== UNIX and Unix-like systems ===
Details of GPT support on UNIX and Unix-like operating systems
OS family	Version or edition	Platform	Read and write support	Boot support	Note
FreeBSD	Since 7.0	IA-32, x86-64, ARM	Yes	Yes	In a hybrid configuration, both GPT and MBR partition identifiers may be used.
Linux	Most of the x86 Linux distributions Fedora 8+ and Ubuntu 8.04+	IA-32, x86-64, ARM	Yes	Yes	Tools such as gdisk, GNU Parted, util-linux v2.23+ fdisk, SYSLINUX, GRUB 0.96 + patches and GRUB 2 have been GPT-enabled. Limited to 256 partitions per disk.
macOS	Since 10.4.0 (some features since 10.4.6)	IA-32, x86-64, PowerPC, Apple silicon	Yes	Yes	Only Intel and Apple silicon Macs can boot from GPT.
MidnightBSD	Since 0.4-CURRENT	IA-32, x86-64	Yes	Yes	In a hybrid configuration, both GPT and MBR partition identifiers may be used.
NetBSD	Since 6.0	IA-32, x86-64, ARM	Yes	Yes	
OpenBSD	Since 5.9	IA-32, x86-64, ARM	Yes	Yes	
Solaris	Since Solaris 10	IA-32, x86-64, SPARC	Yes	Yes	
HP-UX	Since HP-UX 11.20	IA-64	Yes	Yes	

=== Windows: 32-bit versions ===
Windows 7 and earlier do not support UEFI on 32-bit platforms, and therefore do not allow booting from GPT partitions.

Details of GPT support on 32-bit editions of Microsoft Windows
OS version	Release date	Platform	Read or write support	Boot support	Note
Windows 9x	1995-08-24	IA-32	No (Note: Third party implementation exists (GPTTSD))	No	
Windows XP	2001-10-25	IA-32	No	No	
Windows Server 2003	2003-04-24	IA-32	No	No	
Windows Server 2003 SP1	2005-03-30	IA-32	Yes	No	MBR takes precedence in hybrid configuration.
Windows Vista	2006-07-22	IA-32	Yes	No	MBR takes precedence in hybrid configuration.
Windows Server 2008	2008-02-27	IA-32	Yes	No	MBR takes precedence in hybrid configuration.
Windows 7	2009-10-22	IA-32	Yes	No	MBR takes precedence in hybrid configuration.
Windows 8	2012-08-01	IA-32	Yes	Requires UEFI	MBR takes precedence in hybrid configuration.
Windows 8.1	2013-08-27	IA-32	Yes	Requires UEFI	MBR takes precedence in hybrid configuration.
Windows 10	2015-07-29	IA-32, ARM32	Yes	Requires UEFI	MBR takes precedence in hybrid configuration.

=== Windows: 64-bit versions ===
Limited to 128 partitions per disk.

Details of GPT support on 64-bit editions of Microsoft Windows
OS version	Release date	Platform	Read and write support	Boot support	Note
Windows XP 64-Bit Edition for Itanium systems, Version 2002	2001-10-25	IA-64	Yes	Yes	MBR takes precedence in hybrid configuration.
Windows XP 64-Bit Edition, Version 2003	2003-03-28	IA-64	Yes	Yes	MBR takes precedence in hybrid configuration.
Windows XP Professional x64 Edition; Windows Server 2003	2005-04-25	x64	Yes	No (Note: Windows XP 64-bit does not normally support booting from GPT disks, but unofficial methods exist to boot XP from it.)	MBR takes precedence in hybrid configuration.
Windows Server 2003	2005-04-25	IA-64	Yes	Yes	MBR takes precedence in hybrid configuration.
Windows Vista	2006-07-22	x64	Yes	Requires UEFI (Note: Only if using its service pack 1 or 2)	MBR takes precedence in hybrid configuration.
Windows Server 2008	2008-02-27	x64	Yes	Requires UEFI	MBR takes precedence in hybrid configuration.
Windows Server 2008	2008-02-27	IA-64	Yes	Yes	MBR takes precedence in hybrid configuration.
Windows 7	2009-10-22	x64	Yes	Requires UEFI (Note: In a multi-disk setup, non-UEFI bootloader (boot drive) requires MBR-based partitioning, while a system drive can use GUID partitioning.)	MBR takes precedence in hybrid configuration.
Windows Server 2008 R2	2009-10-22	IA-64	Yes	Yes	MBR takes precedence in hybrid configuration.
Windows 8 Windows Server 2012	2012-08-01	x64	Yes	Requires UEFI	MBR takes precedence in hybrid configuration.
Windows 8.1	2013-08-27	x64	Yes	Requires UEFI	MBR takes precedence in hybrid configuration.
Windows 10	2015-07-29	x64, ARM64	Yes	Requires UEFI	MBR takes precedence in hybrid configuration.
Windows Server 2016	2016-10-12	x64	Yes	Requires UEFI	MBR takes precedence in hybrid configuration.
Windows Server 2019	2018-10-02	x64	Yes	Requires UEFI	MBR takes precedence in hybrid configuration.
Windows Server 2022	2021-08-18	x64	Yes	Requires UEFI	MBR takes precedence in hybrid configuration.
Windows 11	2021-10-05	x64, ARM64	Yes	Yes	UEFI is a system requirement for Windows 11.
Windows Server 2025	2024-11-01	x64	Yes	Yes	UEFI is a system requirement for Windows Server 2025.

== Partition type GUIDs ==
"Partition type GUID" means that each partition type is strictly identified by a GUID number unique to that type, and therefore partitions of the same type will all have the same "partition type GUID". Each partition also has a "partition unique GUID" as a separate entry, which as the name implies is a unique id for each partition.

Operating system	Partition type		Globally unique identifier (GUID) (Note: The GUIDs in this table are written as per RFC 4122, i.e. big-endian byte order, recognizable by the position of the version bits. For example, the GUID for an EFI System partition (C12A7328-F81F-11D2-BA4B-00A0C93EC93B), when serialized in GPT data structures (little-endian), corresponds to the hex sequence 28 73 2A C1 1F F8 D2 11 BA 4B 00 A0 C9 3E C9 3B. The first three blocks are byte-swapped to little-endian, the last is a byte array. See details in TN2166)
OS-independent	Unused entry		00000000-0000-0000-0000-000000000000
OS-independent	MBR partition scheme		024DEE41-33E7-11D3-9D69-0008C781F39F
OS-independent	EFI system partition		C12A7328-F81F-11D2-BA4B-00A0C93EC93B
OS-independent	BIOS boot partition (Note: The formation of this GUID does not follow the GUID definition; it is formed by using the ASCII codes for the string "Hah!IdontNeedEFI". Such formation of "GUID" value breaks down the guaranteed uniqueness of GUID.)		21686148-6449-6E6F-744E-656564454649
OS-independent	Intel Fast Flash (iFFS) partition (for Intel Rapid Start technology)		D3BFE2DE-3DAF-11DF-BA40-E3A556D89593
OS-independent	Sony boot partition (Note: Some computer manufacturers have their own GUIDs for partitions that are analogous to the EFI System Partition, but that hold boot loaders to launch manufacturer-specific recovery tools.)		F4019732-066E-4E12-8273-346C5641494F
OS-independent	Lenovo boot partition		BFBFAFE7-A34F-448A-9A5B-6213EB736C22
Windows	Microsoft Reserved Partition (MSR)		E3C9E316-0B5C-4DB8-817D-F92DF00215AE
Windows	Basic data partition (Note: Previously, Linux used the same GUID for the data partitions as Windows (Basic data partition: EBD0A0A2-B9E5-4433-87C0-68B6B72699C7). Linux never had a separate unique partition type GUID defined for its data partitions. This created problems when dual-booting Linux and Windows in UEFI-GPT setup. The new GUID (Linux filesystem data: 0FC63DAF-8483-4772-8E79-3D69D8477DE4) was defined jointly by GPT fdisk and GNU Parted developers. It is identified as type code 0x8300 in GPT fdisk.)		EBD0A0A2-B9E5-4433-87C0-68B6B72699C7
Windows	Logical Disk Manager (LDM) metadata partition		5808C8AA-7E8F-42E0-85D2-E1E90434CFB3
Windows	Logical Disk Manager data partition		AF9B60A0-1431-4F62-BC68-3311714A69AD
Windows	Windows Recovery Environment		DE94BBA4-06D1-4D40-A16A-BFD50179D6AC
Windows	IBM General Parallel File System (GPFS) partition		37AFFC90-EF7D-4E96-91C3-2D7AE055B174
Windows	Storage Spaces partition		E75CAF8F-F680-4CEE-AFA3-B001E56EFC2D
Windows	Storage Replica partition		558D43C5-A1AC-43C0-AAC8-D1472B2923D1
Windows	S2D Cache		EEFF8352-DD2A-44DB-AE83-BEE1CF7481DC
Windows	S2D Cache Metadata		03AAA829-EBFC-4E7E-AAC9-C4D76C63B24B
HP-UX	Data partition		75894C1E-3AEB-11D3-B7C1-7B03A0000000
HP-UX	Service partition		E2A1E728-32E3-11D6-A682-7B03A0000000
Linux	Linux filesystem data		0FC63DAF-8483-4772-8E79-3D69D8477DE4
Linux	RAID partition		A19D880F-05FC-4D3B-A006-743F0F84911E
Linux	Root partition	Alpha	6523F8AE-3EB1-4E2A-A05A-18B695AE656F
Linux	Root partition	ARC	D27F46ED-2919-4CB8-BD25-9531F3C16534
Linux	Root partition	ARM 32‐bit	69DAD710-2CE4-4E3C-B16C-21A1D49ABED3
Linux	Root partition	AArch64	B921B045-1DF0-41C3-AF44-4C6F280D3FAE
Linux	Root partition	IA-64	993D8D3D-F80E-4225-855A-9DAF8ED7EA97
Linux	Root partition	LoongArch 64‐bit	77055800-792C-4F94-B39A-98C91B762BB6
Linux	Root partition	mips: 32‐bit MIPS big‐endian	E9434544-6E2C-47CC-BAE2-12D6DEAFB44C
Linux	Root partition	mips64: 64‐bit MIPS big‐endian	D113AF76-80EF-41B4-BDB6-0CFF4D3D4A25
Linux	Root partition	mipsel: 32‐bit MIPS little‐endian	37C58C8A-D913-4156-A25F-48B1B64E07F0
Linux	Root partition	mips64el: 64‐bit MIPS little‐endian	700BDA43-7A34-4507-B179-EEB93D7A7CA3
Linux	Root partition	PA-RISC	1AACDB3B-5444-4138-BD9E-E5C2239B2346
Linux	Root partition	32‐bit PowerPC	1DE3F1EF-FA98-47B5-8DCD-4A860A654D78
Linux	Root partition	64‐bit PowerPC big‐endian	912ADE1D-A839-4913-8964-A10EEE08FBD2
Linux	Root partition	64‐bit PowerPC little‐endian	C31C45E6-3F39-412E-80FB-4809C4980599
Linux	Root partition	RISC-V 32‐bit	60D5A7FE-8E7D-435C-B714-3DD8162144E1
Linux	Root partition	RISC-V 64‐bit	72EC70A6-CF74-40E6-BD49-4BDA08E8F224
Linux	Root partition	s390	08A7ACEA-624C-4A20-91E8-6E0FA67D23F9
Linux	Root partition	s390x	5EEAD9A9-FE09-4A1E-A1D7-520D00531306
Linux	Root partition	TILE-Gx	C50CDD70-3862-4CC3-90E1-809A8C93EE2C
Linux	Root partition	x86	44479540-F297-41B2-9AF7-D131D5F0458A
Linux	Root partition	x86-64	4F68BCE3-E8CD-4DB1-96E7-FBCAF984B709
Linux	/usr partition	Alpha	E18CF08C-33EC-4C0D-8246-C6C6FB3DA024
Linux	/usr partition	ARC	7978A683-6316-4922-BBEE-38BFF5A2FECC
Linux	/usr partition	ARM 32‐bit	7D0359A3-02B3-4F0A-865C-654403E70625
Linux	/usr partition	AArch64	B0E01050-EE5F-4390-949A-9101B17104E9
Linux	/usr partition	IA-64	4301D2A6-4E3B-4B2A-BB94-9E0B2C4225EA
Linux	/usr partition	LoongArch 64‐bit	E611C702-575C-4CBE-9A46-434FA0BF7E3F
Linux	/usr partition	mips: 32‐bit MIPS big‐endian	773B2ABC-2A99-4398-8BF5-03BAAC40D02B
Linux	/usr partition	mips64: 64‐bit MIPS big‐endian	57E13958-7331-4365-8E6E-35EEEE17C61B
Linux	/usr partition	mipsel: 32‐bit MIPS little‐endian	0F4868E9-9952-4706-979F-3ED3A473E947
Linux	/usr partition	mips64el: 64‐bit MIPS little‐endian	C97C1F32-BA06-40B4-9F22-236061B08AA8
Linux	/usr partition	PA-RISC	DC4A4480-6917-4262-A4EC-DB9384949F25
Linux	/usr partition	32‐bit PowerPC	7D14FEC5-CC71-415D-9D6C-06BF0B3C3EAF
Linux	/usr partition	64‐bit PowerPC big‐endian	2C9739E2-F068-46B3-9FD0-01C5A9AFBCCA
Linux	/usr partition	64‐bit PowerPC little‐endian	15BB03AF-77E7-4D4A-B12B-C0D084F7491C
Linux	/usr partition	RISC-V 32‐bit	B933FB22-5C3F-4F91-AF90-E2BB0FA50702
Linux	/usr partition	RISC-V 64‐bit	BEAEC34B-8442-439B-A40B-984381ED097D
Linux	/usr partition	s390	CD0F869B-D0FB-4CA0-B141-9EA87CC78D66
Linux	/usr partition	s390x	8A4F5770-50AA-4ED3-874A-99B710DB6FEA
Linux	/usr partition	TILE-Gx	55497029-C7C1-44CC-AA39-815ED1558630
Linux	/usr partition	x86	75250D76-8CC6-458E-BD66-BD47CC81A812
Linux	/usr partition	x86-64	8484680C-9521-48C6-9C11-B0720656F69E
Linux	Root verity partition for dm-verity	Alpha	FC56D9E9-E6E5-4C06-BE32-E74407CE09A5
Linux	Root verity partition for dm-verity	ARC	24B2D975-0F97-4521-AFA1-CD531E421B8D
Linux	Root verity partition for dm-verity	ARM 32‐bit	7386CDF2-203C-47A9-A498-F2ECCE45A2D6
Linux	Root verity partition for dm-verity	AArch64	DF3300CE-D69F-4C92-978C-9BFB0F38D820
Linux	Root verity partition for dm-verity	IA-64	86ED10D5-B607-45BB-8957-D350F23D0571
Linux	Root verity partition for dm-verity	LoongArch 64‐bit	F3393B22-E9AF-4613-A948-9D3BFBD0C535
Linux	Root verity partition for dm-verity	mips: 32‐bit MIPS big‐endian	7A430799-F711-4C7E-8E5B-1D685BD48607
Linux	Root verity partition for dm-verity	mips64: 64‐bit MIPS big‐endian	579536F8-6A33-4055-A95A-DF2D5E2C42A8
Linux	Root verity partition for dm-verity	mipsel: 32‐bit MIPS little‐endian	D7D150D2-2A04-4A33-8F12-16651205FF7B
Linux	Root verity partition for dm-verity	mips64el: 64‐bit MIPS little‐endian	16B417F8-3E06-4F57-8DD2-9B5232F41AA6
Linux	Root verity partition for dm-verity	PA-RISC	D212A430-FBC5-49F9-A983-A7FEEF2B8D0E
Linux	Root verity partition for dm-verity	64‐bit PowerPC little‐endian	906BD944-4589-4AAE-A4E4-DD983917446A
Linux	Root verity partition for dm-verity	64‐bit PowerPC big‐endian	9225A9A3-3C19-4D89-B4F6-EEFF88F17631
Linux	Root verity partition for dm-verity	32‐bit PowerPC	98CFE649-1588-46DC-B2F0-ADD147424925
Linux	Root verity partition for dm-verity	RISC-V 32‐bit	AE0253BE-1167-4007-AC68-43926C14C5DE
Linux	Root verity partition for dm-verity	RISC-V 64‐bit	B6ED5582-440B-4209-B8DA-5FF7C419EA3D
Linux	Root verity partition for dm-verity	s390	7AC63B47-B25C-463B-8DF8-B4A94E6C90E1
Linux	Root verity partition for dm-verity	s390x	B325BFBE-C7BE-4AB8-8357-139E652D2F6B
Linux	Root verity partition for dm-verity	TILE-Gx	966061EC-28E4-4B2E-B4A5-1F0A825A1D84
Linux	Root verity partition for dm-verity	x86-64	2C7357ED-EBD2-46D9-AEC1-23D437EC2BF5
Linux	Root verity partition for dm-verity	x86	D13C5D3B-B5D1-422A-B29F-9454FDC89D76
Linux	/usr verity partition for dm-verity	Alpha	8CCE0D25-C0D0-4A44-BD87-46331BF1DF67
Linux	/usr verity partition for dm-verity	ARC	FCA0598C-D880-4591-8C16-4EDA05C7347C
Linux	/usr verity partition for dm-verity	ARM 32‐bit	C215D751-7BCD-4649-BE90-6627490A4C05
Linux	/usr verity partition for dm-verity	AArch64	6E11A4E7-FBCA-4DED-B9E9-E1A512BB664E
Linux	/usr verity partition for dm-verity	IA-64	6A491E03-3BE7-4545-8E38-83320E0EA880
Linux	/usr verity partition for dm-verity	LoongArch 64‐bit	F46B2C26-59AE-48F0-9106-C50ED47F673D
Linux	/usr verity partition for dm-verity	mips: 32‐bit MIPS big‐endian	6E5A1BC8-D223-49B7-BCA8-37A5FCCEB996
Linux	/usr verity partition for dm-verity	mips64: 64‐bit MIPS big‐endian	81CF9D90-7458-4DF4-8DCF-C8A3A404F09B
Linux	/usr verity partition for dm-verity	mipsel: 32‐bit MIPS little‐endian	46B98D8D-B55C-4E8F-AAB3-37FCA7F80752
Linux	/usr verity partition for dm-verity	mips64el: 64‐bit MIPS little‐endian	3C3D61FE-B5F3-414D-BB71-8739A694A4EF
Linux	/usr verity partition for dm-verity	PA-RISC	5843D618-EC37-48D7-9F12-CEA8E08768B2
Linux	/usr verity partition for dm-verity	64‐bit PowerPC little‐endian	EE2B9983-21E8-4153-86D9-B6901A54D1CE
Linux	/usr verity partition for dm-verity	64‐bit PowerPC big‐endian	BDB528A5-A259-475F-A87D-DA53FA736A07
Linux	/usr verity partition for dm-verity	32‐bit PowerPC	DF765D00-270E-49E5-BC75-F47BB2118B09
Linux	/usr verity partition for dm-verity	RISC-V 32‐bit	CB1EE4E3-8CD0-4136-A0A4-AA61A32E8730
Linux	/usr verity partition for dm-verity	RISC-V 64‐bit	8F1056BE-9B05-47C4-81D6-BE53128E5B54
Linux	/usr verity partition for dm-verity	s390	B663C618-E7BC-4D6D-90AA-11B756BB1797
Linux	/usr verity partition for dm-verity	s390x	31741CC4-1A2A-4111-A581-E00B447D2D06
Linux	/usr verity partition for dm-verity	TILE-Gx	2FB4BF56-07FA-42DA-8132-6B139F2026AE
Linux	/usr verity partition for dm-verity	x86-64	77FF5F63-E7B6-4633-ACF4-1565B864C0E6
Linux	/usr verity partition for dm-verity	x86	8F461B0D-14EE-4E81-9AA9-049B6FB97ABD
Linux	Root verity signature partition for dm-verity	Alpha	D46495B7-A053-414F-80F7-700C99921EF8
Linux	Root verity signature partition for dm-verity	ARC	143A70BA-CBD3-4F06-919F-6C05683A78BC
Linux	Root verity signature partition for dm-verity	ARM 32‐bit	42B0455F-EB11-491D-98D3-56145BA9D037
Linux	Root verity signature partition for dm-verity	AArch64	6DB69DE6-29F4-4758-A7A5-962190F00CE3
Linux	Root verity signature partition for dm-verity	IA-64	E98B36EE-32BA-4882-9B12-0CE14655F46A
Linux	Root verity signature partition for dm-verity	LoongArch 64‐bit	5AFB67EB-ECC8-4F85-AE8E-AC1E7C50E7D0
Linux	Root verity signature partition for dm-verity	mips: 32‐bit MIPS big‐endian	BBA210A2-9C5D-45EE-9E87-FF2CCBD002D0
Linux	Root verity signature partition for dm-verity	mips64: 64‐bit MIPS big‐endian	43CE94D4-0F3D-4999-8250-B9DEAFD98E6E
Linux	Root verity signature partition for dm-verity	mipsel: 32‐bit MIPS little‐endian	C919CC1F-4456-4EFF-918C-F75E94525CA5
Linux	Root verity signature partition for dm-verity	mips64el: 64‐bit MIPS little‐endian	904E58EF-5C65-4A31-9C57-6AF5FC7C5DE7
Linux	Root verity signature partition for dm-verity	PA-RISC	15DE6170-65D3-431C-916E-B0DCD8393F25
Linux	Root verity signature partition for dm-verity	64‐bit PowerPC little‐endian	D4A236E7-E873-4C07-BF1D-BF6CF7F1C3C6
Linux	Root verity signature partition for dm-verity	64‐bit PowerPC big‐endian	F5E2C20C-45B2-4FFA-BCE9-2A60737E1AAF
Linux	Root verity signature partition for dm-verity	32‐bit PowerPC	1B31B5AA-ADD9-463A-B2ED-BD467FC857E7
Linux	Root verity signature partition for dm-verity	RISC-V 32‐bit	3A112A75-8729-4380-B4CF-764D79934448
Linux	Root verity signature partition for dm-verity	RISC-V 64‐bit	EFE0F087-EA8D-4469-821A-4C2A96A8386A
Linux	Root verity signature partition for dm-verity	s390	3482388E-4254-435A-A241-766A065F9960
Linux	Root verity signature partition for dm-verity	s390x	C80187A5-73A3-491A-901A-017C3FA953E9
Linux	Root verity signature partition for dm-verity	TILE-Gx	B3671439-97B0-4A53-90F7-2D5A8F3AD47B
Linux	Root verity signature partition for dm-verity	x86-64	41092B05-9FC8-4523-994F-2DEF0408B176
Linux	Root verity signature partition for dm-verity	x86	5996FC05-109C-48DE-808B-23FA0830B676
Linux	/usr verity signature partition for dm-verity	Alpha	5C6E1C76-076A-457A-A0FE-F3B4CD21CE6E
Linux	/usr verity signature partition for dm-verity	ARC	94F9A9A1-9971-427A-A400-50CB297F0F35
Linux	/usr verity signature partition for dm-verity	ARM 32‐bit	D7FF812F-37D1-4902-A810-D76BA57B975A
Linux	/usr verity signature partition for dm-verity	AArch64	C23CE4FF-44BD-4B00-B2D4-B41B3419E02A
Linux	/usr verity signature partition for dm-verity	IA-64	8DE58BC2-2A43-460D-B14E-A76E4A17B47F
Linux	/usr verity signature partition for dm-verity	LoongArch 64‐bit	B024F315-D330-444C-8461-44BBDE524E99
Linux	/usr verity signature partition for dm-verity	mips: 32‐bit MIPS big‐endian	97AE158D-F216-497B-8057-F7F905770F54
Linux	/usr verity signature partition for dm-verity	mips64: 64‐bit MIPS big‐endian	05816CE2-DD40-4AC6-A61D-37D32DC1BA7D
Linux	/usr verity signature partition for dm-verity	mipsel: 32‐bit MIPS little‐endian	3E23CA0B-A4BC-4B4E-8087-5AB6A26AA8A9
Linux	/usr verity signature partition for dm-verity	mips64el: 64‐bit MIPS little‐endian	F2C2C7EE-ADCC-4351-B5C6-EE9816B66E16
Linux	/usr verity signature partition for dm-verity	PA-RISC	450DD7D1-3224-45EC-9CF2-A43A346D71EE
Linux	/usr verity signature partition for dm-verity	64‐bit PowerPC little‐endian	C8BFBD1E-268E-4521-8BBA-BF314C399557
Linux	/usr verity signature partition for dm-verity	64‐bit PowerPC big‐endian	0B888863-D7F8-4D9E-9766-239FCE4D58AF
Linux	/usr verity signature partition for dm-verity	32‐bit PowerPC	7007891D-D371-4A80-86A4-5CB875B9302E
Linux	/usr verity signature partition for dm-verity	RISC-V 32‐bit	C3836A13-3137-45BA-B583-B16C50FE5EB4
Linux	/usr verity signature partition for dm-verity	RISC-V 64‐bit	D2F9000A-7A18-453F-B5CD-4D32F77A7B32
Linux	/usr verity signature partition for dm-verity	s390	17440E4F-A8D0-467F-A46E-3912AE6EF2C5
Linux	/usr verity signature partition for dm-verity	s390x	3F324816-667B-46AE-86EE-9B0C0C6C11B4
Linux	/usr verity signature partition for dm-verity	TILE-Gx	4EDE75E2-6CCC-4CC8-B9C7-70334B087510
Linux	/usr verity signature partition for dm-verity	x86-64	E7BB33FB-06CF-4E81-8273-E543B413E2E2
Linux	/usr verity signature partition for dm-verity	x86	974A71C0-DE41-43C3-BE5D-5C5CCD1AD2C0
Linux	/boot, as an Extended Boot Loader (XBOOTLDR) partition		BC13C2FF-59E6-4262-A352-B275FD6F7172
Linux	Swap partition		0657FD6D-A4AB-43C4-84E5-0933C84B4F4F
Linux	Logical Volume Manager (LVM) partition		E6D6D379-F507-44C2-A23C-238F2A3DF928
Linux	/home partition		933AC7E1-2EB4-4F13-B844-0E14E2AEF915
Linux	/srv (server data) partition		3B8F8425-20E0-4F3B-907F-1A25A76F98E8
Linux	Per‐user home partition		773F91EF-66D4-49B5-BD83-D683BF40AD16
Linux	Plain dm-crypt partition		7FFEC5C9-2D00-49B7-8941-3EA10A5586B7
Linux	LUKS partition		CA7D7CCB-63ED-4C53-861C-1742536059CC
Linux	Reserved		8DA63339-0007-60C0-C436-083AC8230908
GNU/Hurd	Linux filesystem data (Note: Hurd and GRUB use the same Linux ext2 file system to run and Hurd no longer supports the UFS file system)		0FC63DAF-8483-4772-8E79-3D69D8477DE4
GNU/Hurd	Linux Swap partition (Note: Hurd uses the same Linux swap file system)		0657FD6D-A4AB-43C4-84E5-0933C84B4F4F
FreeBSD	Boot partition		83BD6B9D-7F41-11DC-BE0B-001560B84F0F
FreeBSD	BSD disklabel partition		516E7CB4-6ECF-11D6-8FF8-00022D09712B
FreeBSD	Swap partition		516E7CB5-6ECF-11D6-8FF8-00022D09712B
FreeBSD	Unix File System (UFS) partition		516E7CB6-6ECF-11D6-8FF8-00022D09712B
FreeBSD	Vinum volume manager partition		516E7CB8-6ECF-11D6-8FF8-00022D09712B
FreeBSD	ZFS partition		516E7CBA-6ECF-11D6-8FF8-00022D09712B
FreeBSD	nandfs partition		74BA7DD9-A689-11E1-BD04-00E081286ACF
macOS; Darwin	Hierarchical File System Plus (HFS+) partition		48465300-0000-11AA-AA11-00306543ECAC
macOS; Darwin	Apple APFS container APFS FileVault volume container		7C3457EF-0000-11AA-AA11-00306543ECAC
macOS; Darwin	Apple UFS container		55465300-0000-11AA-AA11-00306543ECAC
macOS; Darwin	ZFS (Note: The GUID for /usr on Solaris is used as a generic GUID for ZFS by macOS.)		6A898CC3-1DD2-11B2-99A6-080020736631
macOS; Darwin	Apple RAID partition		52414944-0000-11AA-AA11-00306543ECAC
macOS; Darwin	Apple RAID partition, offline		52414944-5F4F-11AA-AA11-00306543ECAC
macOS; Darwin	Apple Boot partition (Recovery HD)		426F6F74-0000-11AA-AA11-00306543ECAC
macOS; Darwin	Apple Label		4C616265-6C00-11AA-AA11-00306543ECAC
macOS; Darwin	Apple TV Recovery partition		5265636F-7665-11AA-AA11-00306543ECAC
macOS; Darwin	Apple Core Storage Container; HFS+ FileVault volume container		53746F72-6167-11AA-AA11-00306543ECAC
macOS; Darwin	Apple APFS Preboot partition		69646961-6700-11AA-AA11-00306543ECAC
macOS; Darwin	Apple APFS Recovery partition		52637672-7900-11AA-AA11-00306543ECAC
Solaris illumos	Boot partition		6A82CB45-1DD2-11B2-99A6-080020736631
Solaris illumos	Root partition		6A85CF4D-1DD2-11B2-99A6-080020736631
Solaris illumos	Swap partition		6A87C46F-1DD2-11B2-99A6-080020736631
Solaris illumos	Backup partition		6A8B642B-1DD2-11B2-99A6-080020736631
Solaris illumos	/usr partition		6A898CC3-1DD2-11B2-99A6-080020736631
Solaris illumos	/var partition		6A8EF2E9-1DD2-11B2-99A6-080020736631
Solaris illumos	/home partition		6A90BA39-1DD2-11B2-99A6-080020736631
Solaris illumos	Alternate sector		6A9283A5-1DD2-11B2-99A6-080020736631
Solaris illumos	Reserved partition		6A945A3B-1DD2-11B2-99A6-080020736631
Solaris illumos	Reserved partition		6A9630D1-1DD2-11B2-99A6-080020736631
Solaris illumos	Reserved partition		6A980767-1DD2-11B2-99A6-080020736631
Solaris illumos	Reserved partition		6A96237F-1DD2-11B2-99A6-080020736631
Solaris illumos	Reserved partition		6A8D2AC7-1DD2-11B2-99A6-080020736631
NetBSD (Note: NetBSD and MidnightBSD had used the FreeBSD GUIDs before their unique GUIDs were created.)	Swap partition		49F48D32-B10E-11DC-B99B-0019D1879648
NetBSD	FFS partition		49F48D5A-B10E-11DC-B99B-0019D1879648
NetBSD	LFS partition		49F48D82-B10E-11DC-B99B-0019D1879648
NetBSD	RAID partition		49F48DAA-B10E-11DC-B99B-0019D1879648
NetBSD	Concatenated partition		2DB519C4-B10F-11DC-B99B-0019D1879648
NetBSD	Encrypted partition		2DB519EC-B10F-11DC-B99B-0019D1879648
ChromeOS	ChromeOS kernel		FE3A2A5D-4F32-41A7-B725-ACCC3285A309
ChromeOS	ChromeOS rootfs		3CB8E202-3B7E-47DD-8A3C-7FF2A13CFCEC
ChromeOS	ChromeOS firmware		CAB6E88E-ABF3-4102-A07A-D4BB9BE3C1D3
ChromeOS	ChromeOS future use		2E0A753D-9E48-43B0-8337-B15192CB1B5E
ChromeOS	ChromeOS miniOS		09845860-705F-4BB5-B16C-8A8A099CAF52
ChromeOS	ChromeOS hibernate		3F0F8318-F146-4E6B-8222-C28C8F02E0D5
Container Linux by CoreOS	/usr partition (coreos-usr)		5DFBF5F4-2848-4BAC-AA5E-0D9A20B745A6
Container Linux by CoreOS	Resizable rootfs (coreos-resize)		3884DD41-8582-4404-B9A8-E9B84F2DF50E
Container Linux by CoreOS	OEM customizations (coreos-reserved)		C95DC21A-DF0E-4340-8D7B-26CBFA9A03E0
Container Linux by CoreOS	Root filesystem on RAID (coreos-root-raid)		BE9067B9-EA49-4F15-B4F6-F36F8C9E1818
Haiku	Haiku BFS		42465331-3BA3-10F1-802A-4861696B7521
MidnightBSD	Boot partition		85D5E45E-237C-11E1-B4B3-E89A8F7FC3A7
MidnightBSD	Data partition		85D5E45A-237C-11E1-B4B3-E89A8F7FC3A7
MidnightBSD	Swap partition		85D5E45B-237C-11E1-B4B3-E89A8F7FC3A7
MidnightBSD	Unix File System (UFS) partition		0394EF8B-237E-11E1-B4B3-E89A8F7FC3A7
MidnightBSD	Vinum volume manager partition		85D5E45C-237C-11E1-B4B3-E89A8F7FC3A7
MidnightBSD	ZFS partition		85D5E45D-237C-11E1-B4B3-E89A8F7FC3A7
Ceph (Note: The Ceph filesystem uses GUIDs to mark the state of preparation a disk is in.)	Journal		45B0969E-9B03-4F30-B4C6-B4B80CEFF106
Ceph	dm-crypt journal		45B0969E-9B03-4F30-B4C6-5EC00CEFF106
Ceph	OSD		4FBD7E29-9D25-41B8-AFD0-062C0CEFF05D
Ceph	dm-crypt OSD		4FBD7E29-9D25-41B8-AFD0-5EC00CEFF05D
Ceph	Disk in creation		89C57F98-2FE5-4DC0-89C1-F3AD0CEFF2BE
Ceph	dm-crypt disk in creation		89C57F98-2FE5-4DC0-89C1-5EC00CEFF2BE
Ceph	Block		CAFECAFE-9B03-4F30-B4C6-B4B80CEFF106
Ceph	Block DB		30CD0809-C2B2-499C-8879-2D6B78529876
Ceph	Block write-ahead log		5CE17FCE-4087-4169-B7FF-056CC58473F9
Ceph	Lockbox for dm-crypt keys		FB3AABF9-D25F-47CC-BF5E-721D1816496B
Ceph	Multipath OSD		4FBD7E29-8AE0-4982-BF9D-5A8D867AF560
Ceph	Multipath journal		45B0969E-8AE0-4982-BF9D-5A8D867AF560
Ceph	Multipath block		CAFECAFE-8AE0-4982-BF9D-5A8D867AF560
Ceph	Multipath block		7F4A666A-16F3-47A2-8445-152EF4D03F6C
Ceph	Multipath block DB		EC6D6385-E346-45DC-BE91-DA2A7C8B3261
Ceph	Multipath block write-ahead log		01B41E1B-002A-453C-9F17-88793989FF8F
Ceph	dm-crypt block		CAFECAFE-9B03-4F30-B4C6-5EC00CEFF106
Ceph	dm-crypt block DB		93B0052D-02D9-4D8A-A43B-33A3EE4DFBC3
Ceph	dm-crypt block write-ahead log		306E8683-4FE2-4330-B7C0-00A917C16966
Ceph	dm-crypt LUKS journal		45B0969E-9B03-4F30-B4C6-35865CEFF106
Ceph	dm-crypt LUKS block		CAFECAFE-9B03-4F30-B4C6-35865CEFF106
Ceph	dm-crypt LUKS block DB		166418DA-C469-4022-ADF4-B30AFD37F176
Ceph	dm-crypt LUKS block write-ahead log		86A32090-3647-40B9-BBBD-38D8C573AA86
Ceph	dm-crypt LUKS OSD		4FBD7E29-9D25-41B8-AFD0-35865CEFF05D
OpenBSD	Data partition		824CC7A0-36A8-11E3-890A-952519AD3F61
QNX	Power-safe (QNX6) file system		CEF5A9AD-73BC-4601-89F3-CDEEEEE321A1
Plan 9	Plan 9 partition		C91818F9-8025-47AF-89D2-F030D7000C2C
VMware ESX	vmkcore (coredump partition)		9D275380-40AD-11DB-BF97-000C2911D1B8
VMware ESX	VMFS filesystem partition		AA31E02A-400F-11DB-9590-000C2911D1B8
VMware ESX	VMware Reserved		9198EFFC-31C0-11DB-8F78-000C2911D1B8
Android-IA	Bootloader		2568845D-2332-4675-BC39-8FA5A4748D15
Android-IA	Bootloader2		114EAFFE-1552-4022-B26E-9B053604CF84
Android-IA	Boot		49A4D17F-93A3-45C1-A0DE-F50B2EBE2599
Android-IA	Recovery		4177C722-9E92-4AAB-8644-43502BFD5506
Android-IA	Misc		EF32A33B-A409-486C-9141-9FFB711F6266
Android-IA	Metadata		20AC26BE-20B7-11E3-84C5-6CFDB94711E9
Android-IA	System		38F428E6-D326-425D-9140-6E0EA133647C
Android-IA	Cache		A893EF21-E428-470A-9E55-0668FD91A2D9
Android-IA	Data		DC76DDA9-5AC1-491C-AF42-A82591580C0D
Android-IA	Persistent		EBC597D0-2053-4B15-8B64-E0AAC75F4DB1
Android-IA	Vendor		C5A0AEEC-13EA-11E5-A1B1-001E67CA0C3C
Android-IA	Config		BD59408B-4514-490D-BF12-9878D963F378
Android-IA	Factory		8F68CC74-C5E5-48DA-BE91-A0C8C15E9C80
Android-IA	Factory (alt)		9FDAA6EF-4B3F-40D2-BA8D-BFF16BFB887B
Android-IA	Fastboot / Tertiary		767941D0-2085-11E3-AD3B-6CFDB94711E9
Android-IA	OEM		AC6D7924-EB71-4DF8-B48D-E267B27148FF
Android 6.0+ ARM	Android Meta		19A710A2-B3CA-11E4-B026-10604B889DCF
Android 6.0+ ARM	Android EXT		193D1EA4-B3CA-11E4-B075-10604B889DCF
Open Network Install Environment (ONIE)	Boot		7412F7D5-A156-4B13-81DC-867174929325
Open Network Install Environment (ONIE)	Config		D4E6E2CD-4469-46F3-B5CB-1BFF57AFC149
PowerPC	PReP boot		9E1A2D38-C612-4316-AA26-8B49521E5A8B
freedesktop.org OSes (Linux, etc.)	Shared boot loader configuration		BC13C2FF-59E6-4262-A352-B275FD6F7172
Atari TOS	Basic data partition (GEM, BGM, F32)		734E5AFE-F61A-11E6-BC64-92361F002671
Atari TOS	Raw data partition (RAW), XHDI		35540011-B055-499F-842D-C69AECA357B7
VeraCrypt	Encrypted data partition		8C8F8EFF-AC95-4770-814A-21994F2DBC8F
OS/2	ArcaOS Type 1		90B6FF38-B98F-4358-A21F-48F35B4A8AD3
Storage Performance Development Kit (SPDK)	SPDK block device		7C5222BD-8F5D-4087-9C00-BF9843C7B58C
barebox bootloader	barebox-state		4778ED65-BF42-45FA-9C5B-287A1DC4AAB1
U-Boot bootloader	U-Boot environment		3DE21764-95BD-54BD-A5C3-4ABE786F38A8
Fuchsia standard partitions	Bootloader (slot A/B/R)		FE8A2634-5E2E-46BA-99E3-3A192091A350
Fuchsia standard partitions	Durable mutable encrypted system data		D9FD4535-106C-4CEC-8D37-DFC020CA87CB
Fuchsia standard partitions	Durable mutable bootloader data (including A/B/R metadata)		A409E16B-78AA-4ACC-995C-302352621A41
Fuchsia standard partitions	Factory-provisioned read-only system data		F95D940E-CABA-4578-9B93-BB6C90F29D3E
Fuchsia standard partitions	Factory-provisioned read-only bootloader data		10B8DBAA-D2BF-42A9-98C6-A7C5DB3701E7
Fuchsia standard partitions	Fuchsia Volume Manager		49FD7CB8-DF15-4E73-B9D9-992070127F0F
Fuchsia standard partitions	Verified boot metadata (slot A/B/R)		421A8BFC-85D9-4D85-ACDA-B64EEC0133E9
Fuchsia standard partitions	Zircon boot image (slot A/B/R)		9B37FFF6-2E58-466A-983A-F7926D0B04E0
Fuchsia legacy partitions (Note: The legacy Fuchsia GUIDs had two oddities: UUIDs were not generated randomly (several runs of bits were common between partitions), and partitions were uniquely identified by type GUID. The standardized scheme uses randomly-generated GUIDs, and slotted partitions (e.g. zircon_{a,b,r}) share the same type and are distinguished by name and unique GUID.)
Fuchsia legacy partitions	fuchsia-esp		C12A7328-F81F-11D2-BA4B-00A0C93EC93B
Fuchsia legacy partitions	fuchsia-system		606B000B-B7C7-4653-A7D5-B737332C899D
Fuchsia legacy partitions	fuchsia-data		08185F0C-892D-428A-A789-DBEEC8F55E6A
Fuchsia legacy partitions	fuchsia-install		48435546-4953-2041-494E-5354414C4C52
Fuchsia legacy partitions	fuchsia-blob		2967380E-134C-4CBB-B6DA-17E7CE1CA45D
Fuchsia legacy partitions	fuchsia-fvm		41D0E340-57E3-954E-8C1E-17ECAC44CFF5
Fuchsia legacy partitions	Zircon boot image (slot A)		DE30CC86-1F4A-4A31-93C4-66F147D33E05
Fuchsia legacy partitions	Zircon boot image (slot B)		23CC04DF-C278-4CE7-8471-897D1A4BCDF7
Fuchsia legacy partitions	Zircon boot image (slot R)		A0E5CF57-2DEF-46BE-A80C-A2067C37CD49
Fuchsia legacy partitions	sys-config		4E5E989E-4C86-11E8-A15B-480FCF35F8E6
Fuchsia legacy partitions	factory-config		5A3A90BE-4C86-11E8-A15B-480FCF35F8E6
Fuchsia legacy partitions	bootloader		5ECE94FE-4C86-11E8-A15B-480FCF35F8E6
Fuchsia legacy partitions	guid-test		8B94D043-30BE-4871-9DFA-D69556E8C1F3
Fuchsia legacy partitions	Verified boot metadata (slot A)		A13B4D9A-EC5F-11E8-97D8-6C3BE52705BF
Fuchsia legacy partitions	Verified boot metadata (slot B)		A288ABF2-EC5F-11E8-97D8-6C3BE52705BF
Fuchsia legacy partitions	Verified boot metadata (slot R)		6A2460C3-CD11-4E8B-80A8-12CCE268ED0A
Fuchsia legacy partitions	misc		1D75395D-F2C6-476B-A8B7-45CC1C97B476
Fuchsia legacy partitions	emmc-boot1		900B0FC5-90CD-4D4F-84F9-9F8ED579DB88
Fuchsia legacy partitions	emmc-boot2		B2B2E8D1-7C10-4EBC-A2D0-4614568260AD
Minix	Minix filesystem		481B2A38-0561-420B-B72A-F1C4988EFC16
Emu68/AmigaOS	A partition that includes Rigid Disk Block (Note: Due to the limitations of the Rigid Disk Block (RDB), the size of this partition cannot exceed 2 TiB.)		3F82EEBC-87C9-4097-8165-89D6540557C0
Weka NeuralMesh (Storage System)	Weka Data Partition		993EC906-B4E2-11E7-A205-A0A8CD3EA1DE

== Example ==
Here is an example of GUID Partition Table for a 512 GB NVM Express solid state drive as used with multi-booting configuration, containing an EFI system partition, a Microsoft Reserved Partition, three Microsoft Basic Data Partitions (one is Windows standard partition and two are hidden Windows Recovery Environment partitions), and three Linux partitions (including a swap partition):

label: gpt
label-id: 96BB56B7-AE3C-4E94-986E-10E7F3CCA80B
device: /dev/nvme0n1
unit: sectors
first-lba: 34
last-lba: 1000215182
sector-size: 512

/dev/nvme0n1p1 : start=        2048, size=      532480, type=C12A7328-F81F-11D2-BA4B-00A0C93EC93B, uuid=7885D52E-0F50-4E28-B058-8DCE7B7FF921, name="EFI system partition"
/dev/nvme0n1p2 : start=      534528, size=       32768, type=E3C9E316-0B5C-4DB8-817D-F92DF00215AE, uuid=5C34D099-E77A-4B46-9662-430D33E55AFF, name="Microsoft reserved partition"
/dev/nvme0n1p3 : start=      567296, size=   419196928, type=EBD0A0A2-B9E5-4433-87C0-68B6B72699C7, uuid=109218B1-3097-4635-BE5F-044E28C2BCB0, name="Basic data partition"
/dev/nvme0n1p4 : start=   419764224, size=     1669120, type=DE94BBA4-06D1-4D40-A16A-BFD50179D6AC, uuid=527B26E5-2768-444E-AB1F-ECB28201F3C8, attrs="RequiredPartition GUID:63"
/dev/nvme0n1p5 : start=   421435392, size=   329410560, type=0FC63DAF-8483-4772-8E79-3D69D8477DE4, uuid=5C52E480-AEE7-437B-A136-53F8C946D5ED, name="Linux Stuff"
/dev/nvme0n1p6 : start=   750845952, size=   243933184, type=0FC63DAF-8483-4772-8E79-3D69D8477DE4, uuid=023F3B88-D3D9-4E39-9F50-77F242410789, name="Linux Root"
/dev/nvme0n1p7 : start=   994779136, size=     4194304, type=0657FD6D-A4AB-43C4-84E5-0933C84B4F4F, uuid=18F44D65-B28D-4871-AF02-DDBD96771460, name="Swap"
/dev/nvme0n1p8 : start=   998973440, size=     1228800, type=DE94BBA4-06D1-4D40-A16A-BFD50179D6AC, uuid=D4A41B1A-2F28-4AE5-AC67-A2D98FB91E22, name="Basic data partition", attrs="RequiredPartition GUID:63"

== See also ==
- Advanced Active Partition (AAP)
- Apple Partition Map (APM)
- Boot Engineering Extension Record (BEER)
- BSD disklabel
- Das U-Boot
- Device Configuration Overlay (DCO)
- Extended Boot Record (EBR)
- GNU GRUB
- Host Protected Area (HPA)
- Master Boot Record (MBR)
- Partition alignment
- Rigid Disk Block (RDB)
- Volume Table of Contents (VTOC)
