= Emergency repair disk =

A Microsoft Windows Emergency Repair Disk (ERD) is a specially formatted diskette that creates backups of important system files and settings and is used to troubleshoot and repair problems in Microsoft Windows NT and Windows 2000 systems. An ERD is used in conjunction with the Windows repair option. The Emergency Repair Disk provides only the ability to restore the system to a bootable state. It is not a replacement for system and file backups. Note: The emergency repair disk is not to be confused with a standard boot diskette as it cannot be used alone.

Unlike the ERD in Windows NT 4.0, the Windows 2000 ERD does not store registry information. Rather, Windows creates a copy of registry files in the \Winnt\Repair\RegBack directory when the ERD is created. The ERD is not bootable. The original Windows NT or Windows 2000 setup disks need to be used to boot the computer. From there, choosing the option to repair the system will prompt the user for the ERD.

In Windows NT 4.0, the option to create an ERD is available during setup. It can be used for the following:

- Replace damaged system files
- Restore damaged or incorrect registry information
- Rebuild the startup environment

In Windows 2000, an ERD can be created by clicking "Backup" under "System Tools" (Start->Programs->Accessories->System Tools->Backup). It can be used for the following repair functions:

- Inspect and repair the startup environment.
- Verify the Windows 2000 system files and replace missing or damaged files.
- Inspect and repair the boot sector.

Microsoft Windows operating system (OS) installation disks (beginning with Windows 2000) include the Recovery Console, which allows the user to perform administrative operations on services, drives, and local data.
