= Enfants Riches Déprimés =

Luxury fashion house

- Industry: Fashion
- Founded: 2012
- Founder: Henri Alexander Levy
- Headquarters: Los Angeles, California, US
- Key people: Henri Alexander Levy (creative director)
- Website: enfantsrichesdeprimes.com

Enfants Riches Déprimés (French pronunciation: [ɑ̃fɑ̃ ʁiʃ dɛpʁimɛ]), also known as ERD, is an American luxury fashion house based in Los Angeles, California, founded in 2012 by artist and designer Henri Alexander Levy. The brand has built a sustained practice of reifying the symbols of subculture, institutions, and historical movements across garments, objects, environments, performances, and exhibitions.

ERD was the first fashion house to present a runway collection at Christie's Paris. They have also presented at Sotheby's Paris, the Oratoire du Louvre, and Lycée Henri-IV; opened flagships in Paris and Seoul; staged institutional art exhibitions in Paris, Düsseldorf, and Moscow; and collaborated with musicians, artists, and cultural figures including Future, Marilyn Manson, Richard Hell, Larry Clark, Vincent Gallo, and Daft Punk.

== Artistic Practice ==
Levy has consistently identified his art practice as the conceptual foundation of ERD, describing the brand as an extension of it rather than a separate commercial enterprise. Drawing on Art Brut, the work of Jean Dubuffet, and what Levy has called a "childlike, psychotic" quality in unmediated mark-making while utilizing references and symbology on the outer fringes of subculture, he has described his process as an effort to reach subconscious material — noting in an interview with Marvin that he is "interested in making what I call 'isolating objects,'" pieces that are "super specific, super niche," resulting in signifiers of separation that confine rather than liberate.

Themes of repression, psychological pressure, and childhood recur throughout the work, expanding across collections into a taxonomy of characters — described by Levy as "repressed only child, villain, post-modern Lolita" — built from personal imagery and obscure historical references. Levy has cited books on Stalin's early life, childhood drawings, and the imagery of outsider artists as recurring entry points into a psychological territory that runs through both fashion collections and art exhibitions.

The production of ERD is heavily hand-worked and produced in very limited quantities to maximize significance and ateliership. Materials such as exotics, hand-cast silver, Italian wools and cashmere, as well as rare furs and skins are often incorporated. Levy has stated that materiality is inseparable from concept: "I want everything a certain way, it has to have a certain quality and weight... A good idea isn't enough, the materiality is as important as the idea itself. I am only interested in lifetime pieces."

On the conditions of his output, Levy has been equally direct: "The work is either strong or it isn't. My instincts, my vision — that's the highest point. If I've finished a work, the opinion of the rest of the world is worth nothing." And: "In truly productive work there is no room for democracy. Or compromise. You must be very confident in yourself and in what you want."

Since its founding, ERD has expanded progressively beyond garments into a total body of work. Runway presentations evolved into cinematic environments staged at increasingly complex and symbolically loaded venues. Boutique spaces were designed as physical extensions of the brand's interior world. Ephemera — invitations, exhibition posters, video art, vinyl records, and show catalogues — became works in their own right. The ANTI PUBLIC LIBRARY extended the practice into cultural curation. Solo and group exhibitions have brought painting, assemblage, sculpture, and live performance into institutional contexts across Paris, Düsseldorf, and Moscow. Levy has described the project as "indexing and cataloging my reformulated worlds" — an ongoing accumulation rather than a series of discrete seasonal releases.

== History ==
Enfants Riches Déprimés was founded in late 2012 after Levy finished his studies of fine art at UCLA. He described the brand as rooted entirely in personal experience rather than market consideration, stating in a 2025 Whitewall interview that "everything regarding the brand is connected to my heart, my subconscious, and my pain." The brand's first designs included a shredded T-shirt printed with the crest of Institut Le Rosey, the Swiss boarding school Levy had attended — an early instance of the isolating specificity intended to narrow rather than broaden the brand's audience.

Upon release, ERD generated immediate cultural traction, leading to a growing following that included Kanye West, Courtney Love, Frances Bean Cobain, members of Guns N' Roses, and Future.

From 2015 to 2017, ERD expanded its stockist base to include Maxfield, 10 Corso Como, Luisa Via Roma, Barneys New York, The Webster, and Trois Pommes. During this period, designs from ERD were widely cited as a reference point for other luxury houses, including Gucci, Balmain and Vetements. ERD subsequently informed stockists that evidence of carrying brands whose work appropriated ERD's designs — or what Levy termed "mid-level contemporary bullshit" — would lead to a severance of the account. In 2015, ERD collaborated with Vans on a custom high-top sneaker featuring hand-drawn graphics. For the Fall/Winter 2016 collection, ERD collaborated with the estate of Cy Twombly on a capsule collection drawing on the late artist's Polaroid work.

In June 2017, Enfants Riches Déprimés became the first fashion house to stage a presentation at Christie's Paris — the auction house founded in 1766 — presenting its SS18 pre-collection to an invited audience. Later that year, ERD collaborated with Daft Punk on a merchandise release at Maxfield Gallery in Los Angeles, and in July transformed the gallery into a conceptual pawn shop — presenting a capsule of archival and new limited-edition pieces within an environment Levy described as an effort to let visitors be "fully pulled into the world of the ERD studio." The Maxfield presentation marked an early instance of the brand's expansion beyond garments into cohesive designed experiences.

In 2019, ERD opened its first boutique at 79 Rue Charlot in the Marais district of Paris. Designed in collaboration with artist and architect Didier Fiúza Faustino, the dual-level space occupies a former jeweler's atelier. The interior features stainless steel wall panels, dark marble countertops, chainmail curtains, and a lime-colored Pierre Paulin ABCD sofa on the lower level. Levy described the space as "a mixture of a bank vault, brutalist torture chamber and Clockwork Orange," noting that he designed it so visitors would feel as physically uncomfortable as possible. That same year, Levy collaborated with rapper Future on the artistic direction of the EP Save Me, providing the cover painting and directing all music videos for the release.

In October 2022, ERD presented its SS23 collection at Lycée Henri-IV in Paris — whose alumni include Jean Baudrillard, Michel Foucault, and Jean-Paul Sartre.

On September 29, 2023, ERD presented its SS24 collection at the L'Oratoire du Louvre during Paris Fashion Week. The presentation incorporated hospital beds as set elements within the historic Protestant church.

On March 3, 2024, ERD staged its AW24 collection, titled THE SUN. DISAPPOINTS ME SO., across nine floors of an abandoned brutalist parking garage in Paris's 8th arrondissement. Models descended through the structure amid green-lit fog and vintage luxury automobiles including Mercedes-Benz and Rolls-Royce. Levy described his approach in a Whitewall interview: "I look at the runway shows as films. The show being a runway isn't enough for me. I need my shows to be cinematic and emotional."

On September 29, 2024, ERD presented its SS25 collection at Sotheby's Paris during Paris Fashion Week. The presentation incorporated a series of steel cage installations occupied by live performance artists — including an ensemble of musicians playing throughout the show and a figure having their head shaved.

In March 2025, ERD presented its FW25 collection, titled dictatorship / trimestre d'hiver, at Lycée Carnot in Paris. The show opened with a cardboard tank rolling across the gymnasium floor, with child dictators in attendance, and closed with a second mobile tank installation. The collection was covered in Vogue. Photographer and filmmaker Larry Clark was among the show's references.

In 2025, ERD opened its second flagship store in the Gangnam District of Seoul, South Korea, designed in collaboration with New Zealand architecture firm Fearon Hay. The interior is characterized by an austere institutional severity — concrete surfaces, rigid geometries — set against furniture and objects chosen for personal and art-historical significance: a Jean Prouvé door, reclaimed wood from dismantled Korean structures, Gustav Serrurier-Bovy club chairs in mahogany and brass, and the brand's signature chainmail curtains. Wallace Berman verifax collages and assemblage works by Levy are installed throughout.

In October 2025, ERD presented its SS26 collection at the Hôtel de Maisons in Paris — the former residence of Karl Lagerfeld. Punk musician Richard Hell walked the runway in a Bordeaux-colored suit.

On March 8, 2026, ERD presented its FW26 collection at the Maison de la Chimie in Paris. The courtyard was filled with artificial snow, and musician Marilyn Manson opened the show. The show's centerpiece was a bronze sculpture by Levy, to which a model remained chained throughout the presentation. The show was covered in Vogue and fell on International Women's Day.

In 2026, the brand announced plans to open a third flagship at 155 Franklin Street in the TriBeCa neighborhood of New York City. That same year, ERD published King of Hate, an 83-page limited edition photo book featuring Vincent Gallo and Afton Burton, shot by Terry Richardson, limited to 200 copies under the E.R.D Paper imprint.

== Anti Public Library ==
In 2024, Levy opened the ANTI PUBLIC LIBRARY adjacent to the ERD flagship at 79 Rue Charlot in the Marais district of Paris. The ANTI PUBLIC LIBRARY carries rare printed goods and original pressings of vinyl records. The ANTI PUBLIC LIBRARY carries genres selected for their alignment with the sensibility that drives the broader ERD practice rather than for commercial viability. As a physical environment organized by taste and information, it extends the world of ERD through a further layer of reference: a hub for an outsider community built around the same instincts that inform the brand's output.

== Art Exhibitions ==
=== Subversive Design, NRW-Forum Düsseldorf (2022) ===
Levy participated in Subversive Design, a group exhibition at NRW-Forum Düsseldorf featuring twenty designers including Demna Gvasalia for Balenciaga and MSCHF. Framed by the museum as a "critical department store," the space was configured as a warehouse with functional shelving systems. ERD contributed a selection of objects: a Loro Piana cashmere noose; a jacket featuring a portrait of Vladimir Putin painted by George W. Bush; a Loro Piana knit Columbine sweater; and a black teddy bear Levy referred to as Object Pathétique. The exhibition also featured a continuous screening of Aluminum Tastes Like Fear, a documentary film about the brand directed by André Brato.

=== Orphaned Works, Galerie Raphaël Durazzo, Paris (2023) ===
During Paris Men's Fashion Week 2023, Levy opened Orphaned Works, a solo exhibition of 24 original works at Galerie Raphaël Durazzo, 23 Rue du Cirque. The show comprised works on paper and large-scale paintings developed through instinct-driven mark-making: ink-rendered figures, collaged and crossed-out text, and paint applied against deep black grounds. Courtney Love, who attended the opening, described Levy in Hero magazine as "not afraid to push himself and his work to the edge of a precipice, consequences be damned," characterizing his practice as the work of "an artist at war — with himself and the darkness he tries to dig out of his tormented psyche."

=== Ask Us If He Was Our Son, Triumph Gallery, Moscow (2025–2026) ===
In December 2025, Levy presented Ask Us If He Was Our Son, his first large-scale solo exhibition in Russia, at Triumph Gallery in Moscow. The show occupied two floors and comprised paintings, works on paper, ink drawings, assemblage, bronze sculptures, and black paintings created between 2015 and 2025. The lower floor gathered early works including Depression Graph (2016), which Levy described in a Snob interview as among the most "charged with dark emotions" in the body of work. The Art Newspaper Russia characterized the practice as deploying "bold underground, deconstruction, symbolism and provocative composition of details." Gallery director Dmitry Khankin stated at the opening that he expected Levy's works — then selling for tens of thousands of euros — to command multiples of that figure within a few years.

== Influences ==
Levy has cited a broad range of visual art, music, and fashion as influences on his work. In an interview with V magazine, he named painters Robert Motherwell, Cy Twombly, Antoni Tàpies and Jean Dubuffet as significant references, noting that those familiar with Tàpies' work "will see he has influenced ERD from the informality to the way he uses furniture and rags." He has also cited the drawings of Raymond Pettibon and the work of artists Rodney McMillian, Barbara Kruger, and Andrea Fraser.

In fashion, Levy has cited Rei Kawakubo and Yohji Yamamoto as formative influences. Musical references have included punk figures Darby Crash and Johnny Thunders, whose work Levy has described as central to his understanding of the punk sensibility — one he has framed as deeply personal rather than political: "I'm angry at my parents for sending me to this place for a fucking year. I'm angry at the people in the rehab for telling me what to do all the time. I'm angry at my teachers and principals for kicking me out of every school I go to and not understanding me. That was, for me, my relationship with punk and that attitude."

== Runway Shows ==
All runway presentations have been held in Paris as part of Paris Fashion Week unless otherwise noted.

Runway Presentations
Season	Date	Venue	Notes
SS17	September 2016	Paris	
SS18 (pre-collection)	June 2017	Christie's Paris	First fashion house to present at Christie's
AW18	January 2018	Paris	
SS19	June 2018	Paris	
AW19	January 2019	Paris	
AW21	2021	—	Presented as a fashion film
SS23	October 2022	Lycée Henri-IV, Paris	
AW23	March 2023	Paris	
SS24	September 29, 2023	L'Oratoire du Louvre, Paris	Hospital beds incorporated into set design
AW24 THE SUN. DISAPPOINTS ME SO.	March 3, 2024	Abandoned parking garage, 8th arrondissement, Paris	
SS25	September 29, 2024	Sotheby's Paris	Steel cage installations; live performance artists; model carrying live rat
AW25 dictatorship / trimestre d'hiver	March 2025	Lycée Carnot, Paris	References Larry Clark; opened with cardboard tank; covered in Vogue
SS26	October 2025	Hôtel de Maisons, Paris	Richard Hell walked the runway; show featured bronze sculpture and child on blackened metal swing installation; former residence of Karl Lagerfeld
AW26	March 2026	Maison de la Chimie, Paris	Marilyn Manson opened the show; presented on International Women's Day
