= Partition type =

Table inside a master boot record

The partition type (or partition ID) in a partition's entry in the partition table inside a master boot record (MBR) is a byte value intended to specify the file system the partition contains or to flag special access methods used to access these partitions (e.g. special CHS mappings, LBA access, logical mapped geometries, special driver access, hidden partitions, secured or encrypted file systems, etc.).

== Overview ==
Lists of assigned partition types to be used in the partition table in the MBR were originally maintained by IBM and Microsoft internally. When the market of PC operating systems and disk tools grew and liberated, other vendors had a need to assign special partition types to their products as well. As Microsoft neither documented all partition types already assigned by them nor wanted to maintain foreign assignments, third parties started to simply assign partition types on their own behalf in a mostly uncoordinated trial-and-error manner. This led to various conflicting assignments sometimes causing severe compatibility problems between certain products.

Several industry experts including Hale Landis, Ralf D. Brown, Matthias R. Paul, and Andries E. Brouwer in the 1990s started to research partition types and published (and later synchronized) partition type lists in order to help document the industry de facto standard and thereby reduce the risk of further conflicts. Some of them also actively helped to maintain software dealing with partitions to work with the updated lists, indicated conflicts, devised additional detection methods and work-arounds for vendors, or engaged in coordinating new non-conflictive partition type assignments as well.

It is up to an operating system's boot loader or kernel how to interpret the value. So the table specifies which operating systems or disk-related products introduced an ID and what file system or special partition type they mapped it to. Partitions with partition types unknown to the software should be treated as reserved but occupied disk storage space which should not be dealt with by the software, save for partition managers.

== Local or Experimental Use ==
While the list is not officially maintained, new assignments should be coordinated.

In particular temporary partition type assignments for local or experimental projects can utilize type 7Fh in order to avoid conflicts with already assigned types. This type was specially reserved for individual use as part of the Alternative OS Development Partition Standard (AODPS) initiative since 2002.

== List of partition IDs ==
This is a list of known master boot record partition types on IBM PC compatible computers:

Partition ID	Occurrence	Access	Bootable	Type	Origin	Supported by	Description
00h	MBR, EBR	—N/a	No	Free	IBM	All	Empty partition entry
01h	MBR, EBR	CHS, LBA	x86, 68000, 8080/Z80	File system	IBM	DOS 2.0+	FAT12 as primary partition in first physical 32 MB of disk or as logical drive anywhere on disk (else use 06h instead)
02h	MBR	CHS	x86, 68000, Z8000, PDP-11	File system	Microsoft, SCO	XENIX	XENIX root (see 03h and FFh)
03h	MBR	CHS	No	File system	Microsoft, SCO	XENIX	XENIX usr (see 02h and FFh)
04h	MBR, EBR	CHS, LBA	x86, 68000, 8080/Z80	File system	Microsoft	DOS 3.0+	FAT16 with less than 65,536 sectors (32 MB). As primary partition it must reside in first physical 32 MB of disk, or as logical drive anywhere on disk (else use 06h instead).
05h	MBR, EBR	CHS, (LBA)	No, AAP	Container	IBM	Some versions of DOS 3.2, DOS 3.3+	Extended partition with CHS addressing. It must reside within the first physical 8 GB of disk, else use 0Fh instead (see 0Fh, 85h, C5h, D5h)
06h	MBR, EBR	CHS, LBA	x86	File system	Compaq	DOS 3.31+	FAT16B with 65,536 or more sectors. It must reside within the first 8 GB of disk unless used for logical drives in an 0Fh extended partition (else use 0Eh instead). Also used for FAT12 and FAT16 volumes in primary partitions if they are not residing in first physical 32 MB of disk. (Note: MS-DOS/PC DOS 2.0-3.1 cannot cope with hard disk partitions outside the first 32 MB of the disk. Therefore, FAT12 and FAT16 volumes in primary partitions physically residing outside this area must not use partition IDs 01h and 04h, even if they were otherwise small enough to be recognized by these DOS versions. In order to hide these volumes from these DOS issues 06h can be used instead. DOS distinguishes FAT types by their number of clusters, not by their partition ID, therefore, this does not cause any problems for DOS 3.31 and higher except for a possibly wrong file system type display in FDISK.)
07h	MBR, EBR	CHS, LBA	x86	File system	Microsoft, IBM	OS/2 1.2+	IFS
07h	MBR, EBR	CHS, LBA	286	File system	IBM	OS/2 1.2+, Windows NT	HPFS
07h	MBR, EBR	CHS, LBA	386	File system	Microsoft	Windows NT	NTFS
07h	MBR, EBR	CHS, LBA	Yes	File system	Microsoft	Windows Embedded CE	exFAT
07h				File system	Quantum Software Systems	QNX 2	QNX "qnx" (7) (pre-1988 only) (Note: QNX partition IDs 07h, 08h, 09h, 4Dh (77), 4Eh (78), 4Fh (79), as well as B1h (177), B2h (178) and B3h (179).)
08h	MBR	CHS	x86	File system	Commodore	Commodore MS-DOS 3.x	Logical sectored FAT12 or FAT16 (Note: Known partition IDs for logical sectored FATs include: 08h (Commodore MS-DOS 3.x), 11h (Leading Edge MS-DOS 3.x), 14h (AST MS-DOS 3.x), 24h (NEC MS-DOS 3.30), 56h (AT&T MS-DOS 3.x), E5h (Tandy MS-DOS), F2h (Sperry IT MS-DOS 3.x, Unisys MS-DOS 3.3 — also used by Digital Research DOS Plus 2.1). While non-standard and sub-optimal these FAT variants are perfectly valid according to the specifications of the file system itself, although default issues of MS-DOS / PC DOS 3.x were not able to cope with them. Most of these vendor specific FAT12 and FAT16 variants can be mounted by more flexible file system implementations in operating systems such as DR-DOS simply by changing the partition ID to one of the recognized types. Also, if they no longer need to be recognized by their original operating systems, existing partitions can be "converted" into FAT12 and FAT16 volumes compliant with versions of MS-DOS/PC DOS like 5.0-6.3, which do not support logical sector sizes different from 512 bytes, by switching to a BPB with 32-bit entry for the number of sectors, as introduced since DOS 3.31, keeping the cluster size and reducing the logical sector size in the BPB down to 512 bytes, while at the same time increasing the counts of logical sectors per cluster, reserved logical sectors, total logical sectors, and logical sectors per FAT by the same factor.)
08h		CHS	x86	File system	IBM	OS/2 1.0-1.3	OS/2 (FAT?)
08h				File system	IBM	AIX	AIX boot/split
08h				File system	Quantum Software Systems	QNX 1.x/2.x	QNX "qny" (8)
08h				Container	Dell		Partition spanning multiple drives
09h				File system	IBM	AIX	AIX data/boot
09h				File system	Quantum Software Systems	QNX 1.x/2.x	QNX "qnz" (9)
09h	MBR	CHS	286	File system	Mark Williams Company	Coherent	Coherent file system
09h	MBR			File system	Microware	OS-9	OS-9 RBF
0Ah				Service	PowerQuest, IBM	OS/2	OS/2 Boot Manager (Note: Used by OS/2 Boot Manager: 0Ah, 11h, 14h, 15h, 16h, 17h, 1Bh, 1Ch, 1Eh, 1Fh.)
0Ah				Swap	Mark Williams Company	Coherent	Coherent swap partition
0Bh	MBR, EBR	CHS, LBA	x86	File system	Microsoft	DOS 7.1+	FAT32 with CHS addressing
0Ch	MBR, EBR	LBA	x86	File system	Microsoft	DOS 7.1+	FAT32 with LBA
0Eh	MBR, EBR	LBA	x86	File system	Microsoft	DOS 7.0+	FAT16B with LBA
0Fh	MBR, EBR	LBA	No, AAP	Container	Microsoft	DOS 7.0+	Extended partition with LBA (see 05h and CFh)
11h	MBR	CHS	x86	File system	Leading Edge	Leading Edge MS-DOS 3.x	Logical sectored FAT12 or FAT16
11h				Hidden FS	IBM	OS/2 Boot Manager	Hidden FAT12 (corresponds with 01h)
12h	MBR	CHS, LBA	x86	Service FS	Compaq		Configuration partition (bootable FAT with MS-DOS); Recovery partition (bootable FAT32 with Windows setup)
12h	MBR		x86	Service	Gang of Nine	EISA machines	EISA configuration utility for the system
12h				Hibernation	Compaq	Compaq Contura	Hibernation partition
12h	MBR		x86	Service FS	NCR		Diagnostics and firmware partition (bootable FAT)
12h	MBR		x86	Service FS	Intel		Service partition (bootable FAT) (see 98h)
12h				Service FS	IBM		Rescue and Recovery partition
14h				File system	AST	AST MS-DOS 3.x	Logical sectored FAT12 or FAT16 (see AST MBR)
14h			x86, 68000, 8080/Z80	Hidden FS	IBM	OS/2 Boot Manager	Hidden FAT16 (corresponds with 04h)
14h		LBA	x86	File system	Lasse Krogh Thygesen	Maverick OS	Omega file system
15h			No, AAP	Hidden container	IBM	OS/2 Boot Manager	Hidden extended partition with CHS addressing (corresponds with 05h)
15h		LBA	No	Swap	Lasse Krogh Thygesen	Maverick OS	Swap
16h			x86, 68000, 8080/Z80	Hidden FS	IBM	OS/2 Boot Manager	Hidden FAT16B (corresponds with 06h)
17h				Hidden FS	IBM	OS/2 Boot Manager	Hidden IFS (corresponds with 07h)
17h				Hidden FS	IBM	OS/2 Boot Manager	Hidden HPFS (corresponds with 07h)
17h				Hidden FS	IBM	OS/2 Boot Manager	Hidden NTFS (corresponds with 07h)
17h				Hidden FS	IBM	OS/2 Boot Manager	Hidden exFAT (corresponds with 07h)
18h			No	Hibernation	AST	AST Windows	AST Zero Volt Suspend or SmartSleep partition
19h					Willow Schlanger	Willowtech Photon coS	Willowtech Photon coS (see 20h)
1Bh				Hidden FS	IBM	OS/2 Boot Manager	Hidden FAT32 (corresponds with 0Bh)
1Ch				Hidden FS	IBM	OS/2 Boot Manager	Hidden FAT32 with LBA (corresponds with 0Ch)
1Ch				Service FS	ASUS	ASUS eRecovery	ASUS recovery partition (Hidden FAT32 with LBA, see 0Ch)
1Eh				Hidden FS	IBM	OS/2 Boot Manager	Hidden FAT16 with LBA (corresponds with 0Eh)
1Fh	MBR, EBR	LBA		Hidden container	IBM	OS/2 Boot Manager	Hidden extended partition with LBA addressing (corresponds with 0Fh)
20h			?	File system	Microsoft	Windows Mobile	Windows Mobile update XIP
20h				File system	Willow Schlanger		Willowsoft Overture File System (OFS1) (see 19h)
21h	MBR			?	Hewlett-Packard	HP Volume Expansion	(Note: HP Volume Expansion is a variant of SpeedStor and uses partition IDs 21h, A1h, A3h, A4h, A6h, B1h, B3h, B4h, and B6h.)
21h				File system	Dave Poirier	Oxygen	FSo2 (Oxygen File System) (see 22h)
22h				Container	Dave Poirier	Oxygen	Oxygen Extended Partition Table (see 21h)
23h			Yes	File system	Microsoft	Windows Mobile	Windows Mobile boot XIP
24h	MBR	CHS	x86	File system	NEC	NEC MS-DOS 3.30	Logical sectored FAT12 or FAT16 (see NEC MBR)
27h				Service FS	Microsoft	Windows	Windows Recovery Environment (RE) partition (hidden NTFS partition type 07h)
27h	MBR	LBA	Yes	Service FS	Acer	D2D eRecovery	Rescue partition (Hidden NTFS labeled "PQService", corresponds to 07h)
27h			Yes	Service	MikroTik	Linux (RouterBOARD 500)	RooterBOOT kernel partition (contains a raw ELF Linux kernel, no file system)
2Ah				File system	Kurt Skauen	AtheOS	AtheOS file system (AthFS, AFS) (an extension of BFS, see 2Bh and EBh)
2Ah	MBR, EBR	LBA	x86	File system			Reserved (see CAh)
2Bh				File system	Kristian van der Vliet	SyllableOS	SyllableSecure (SylStor), a variant of AthFS (an extension of BFS, see 2Ah and EBh)
30h	MBR	CHS	x86	File system	Digital Research	Personal CP/M-86	Found in some OEM Siemens systems instead of DBh. Filesystem parameters are in the following sector (LBA 1), not the partition itself.
31h					Microsoft, IBM		Reserved
32h	MBR	Yes	Container		Alien Internet Services	nOS	Used as a container for nOS partitions (kernel and driver caching, user file storage, swap, etc.)
33h					Microsoft, IBM		Reserved
34h					Microsoft, IBM		Reserved
35h	MBR, EBR	CHS, LBA	No	File system	IBM	OS/2 Warp Server / eComStation	JFS (OS/2 implementation of AIX Journaling File system)
36h					Microsoft, IBM		Reserved
38h				File system	Timothy Williams	THEOS	THEOS version 3.2, 2 GB partition
39h				Container	Bell Labs	Plan 9	Plan 9 edition 3 partition (sub-partitions described in second sector of partition)
39h				File system	Timothy Williams	THEOS	THEOS version 4 spanned partition
3Ah				File system	Timothy Williams	THEOS	THEOS version 4, 4 GB partition
3Bh				Container	Timothy Williams	THEOS	THEOS version 4 extended partition
3Ch				Service	PowerQuest	PartitionMagic	PqRP (PartitionMagic or DriveImage in progress)
3Dh				Hidden FS	PowerQuest	PartitionMagic	Hidden NetWare
40h					PICK Systems	PICK	PICK R83
40h					VenturCom	Venix	Venix 80286
41h			Yes			Personal RISC	Personal RISC Boot
41h					Linux	Linux	Old Linux/Minix (disk shared with DR DOS 6.0) (corresponds with 81h)
41h			PowerPC		PowerPC	PowerPC	PPC PReP (Power PC Reference Platform) Boot
42h				Secured FS	Peter Gutmann	SFS	Secure File system (SFS)
42h			No		Linux	Linux	Old Linux swap (disk shared with DR DOS 6.0) (corresponds with 82h)
42h				Container	Microsoft	Windows 2000, XP, etc.	Dynamic extended partition marker
43h			Yes	File system	Linux	Linux	Old Linux native (disk shared with DR DOS 6.0) (corresponds with 83h)
44h					Wildfile	GoBack	Norton GoBack, WildFile GoBack, Adaptec GoBack, Roxio GoBack
45h		CHS			Priam		Priam (see also 5Ch)
45h	MBR	CHS	Yes			Boot-US	Boot-US boot manager (1 cylinder)
45h					Jochen Liedtke, GMD	EUMEL/ELAN	EUMEL/ELAN (L2)
46h					Jochen Liedtke, GMD	EUMEL/ELAN	EUMEL/ELAN (L2)
47h					Jochen Liedtke, GMD	EUMEL/ELAN	EUMEL/ELAN (L2)
48h					Jochen Liedtke, GMD	EUMEL/ELAN	EUMEL/ELAN (L2), ERGOS L3
4Ah	MBR		Yes		Nick Roberts	AdaOS	Aquila (see 7Fh)
4Ah	MBR, EBR	CHS, LBA	No	File system	Mark Aitchison	ALFS/THIN	ALFS/THIN advanced lightweight file system for DOS
4Ch					ETH Zürich	ETH Oberon	Aos (A2) file system (76)
4Dh					Quantum Software Systems	QNX 4.x, Neutrino	Primary QNX POSIX volume on disk (77)
4Eh					Quantum Software Systems	QNX 4.x, Neutrino	Secondary QNX POSIX volume on disk (78)
4Fh					Quantum Software Systems	QNX 4.x, Neutrino	Tertiary QNX POSIX volume on disk (79)
4Fh			Yes		ETH Zürich	ETH Oberon	Boot / native file system (79)
50h					ETH Zürich	ETH Oberon	Alternative native file system (80)
50h			No		Ontrack	Disk Manager 4	Read-only partition (old)
50h						LynxOS	Lynx RTOS
50h						Novell	
51h					Novell		
51h			No		Ontrack	Disk Manager 4-6	Read-write partition (Aux 1)
52h	MBR	CHS		File system	Digital Research	CP/M-80	CP/M-80
52h					Microport	System V/AT, V/386	
53h					Ontrack	Disk Manager 6	Auxiliary 3 (WO)
54h					Ontrack	Disk Manager 6	Dynamic Drive Overlay (DDO)
55h					MicroHouse / StorageSoft	EZ-Drive	EZ-Drive, Maxtor, MaxBlast, or DriveGuide INT 13h redirector volume
56h					AT&T	AT&T MS-DOS 3.x	Logical sectored FAT12 or FAT16
56h					MicroHouse / StorageSoft	EZ-Drive	Disk Manager partition converted to EZ-BIOS
56h					Golden Bow	VFeature	VFeature partitioned volume
57h					MicroHouse / StorageSoft	DrivePro	
57h					Novell		VNDI partition
59h	MBR, EBR	CHS, LBA	Yes	File system	Yocto	yocOS	yocFS
5Ch		CHS		Container	Priam	EDISK	Priam EDisk Partitioned Volume (see also 45h)
61h	MBR	CHS		Hidden FS	Storage Dimensions	SpeedStor	Hidden FAT12 (corresponds to E1h) (Note: SpeedStor is an extended storage support driver for DOS for IBM PC/XT (v. 6.03) and IBM PC/AT (v. 6.5). Its custom partition types are E1h, E4h and F4h which can be marked read-only (becoming E3h, E6h, F6h), hidden (61h, 64h, 74h) or hidden read-only (63h, 66h, 76h).)
63h		CHS		File system	AT&T	SCO Unix, ISC, UnixWare, AT&T System V/386, ix, MtXinu BSD 4.3 on Mach	
63h		CHS	Yes	File system	Mach and BSD	GNU/Hurd	Old GNU/Hurd with UFS support (corresponds with 83h)
63h	MBR	CHS		Hidden FS	Storage Dimensions	SpeedStor	Hidden read-only FAT12 (corresponds to E3h)
64h				?	Storage Dimensions	SpeedStor	Hidden FAT16 (corresponds to E4h)
64h				File system	Novell	NetWare	NetWare File System 286/2
64h				Secured FS	Solomon		PC-ARMOUR
65h				File system	Novell	NetWare	NetWare File System 386
66h				?	Novell	NetWare	Storage Management Services (SMS)
66h	MBR	CHS		Hidden FS	Storage Dimensions	SpeedStor	Hidden read-only FAT16 (corresponds to E6h)
67h				?	Novell	NetWare	Wolf Mountain cluster
68h				?	Novell	NetWare	
69h				?	Novell	NetWare 5	
69h				?	Novell	NetWare	Novell Storage Services (NSS)
6Ch	MBR	CHS, LBA	x86	Container	DragonFly BSD	BSD	BSD slice (DragonFly BSD)
70h				Service		DiskSecure	DiskSecure multiboot
71h					Microsoft, IBM		Reserved
72h	MBR, EBR	CHS	x86	Policy FS		APTI conformant systems	APTI alternative FAT12 (CHS, SFN) (corresponds with 01h)
72h				File system	Nordier	Unix V7/x86	V7/x86
73h					Microsoft, IBM		Reserved
74h	MBR	CHS		Hidden FS	Storage Dimensions	SpeedStor	Hidden FAT16B (corresponds to F4h)
75h				File system	IBM	PC/IX	
76h					Storage Dimensions	SpeedStor	Hidden read-only FAT16B (corresponds to F6h)
77h				File system	Novell		VNDI, M2FS, M2CS
78h			Yes	File system	Geurt Vos		XOSL bootloader file system
79h	MBR, EBR	CHS	x86	Policy FS		APTI conformant systems	APTI alternative FAT16 (CHS, SFN) (corresponds with 04h)
7Ah	MBR, EBR	LBA	x86	Policy FS		APTI conformant systems	APTI alternative FAT16 (LBA, SFN) (corresponds with 0Eh)
7Bh	MBR, EBR	CHS	x86	Policy FS		APTI conformant systems	APTI alternative FAT16B (CHS, SFN) (corresponds with 06h)
7Ch	MBR, EBR	LBA	x86	Policy FS		APTI conformant systems	APTI alternative FAT32 (LBA, SFN) (corresponds with 0Ch)
7Dh	MBR, EBR	CHS	x86	Policy FS		APTI conformant systems	APTI alternative FAT32 (CHS, SFN) (corresponds with 0Bh)
7Eh	MBR, EBR		No	Cache	Romex Software	PrimoCache	Level 2 cache
7Fh	MBR, EBR				Alternative OS Development Partition Standard		Reserved for individual or local use and temporary or experimental projects
80h				File system	Andrew Tanenbaum	Minix 1.1-1.4a	MINIX file system (old)
81h				File system	Andrew Tanenbaum	Minix 1.4b+	MINIX file system (corresponds with 41h)
82h			No	Swap	Linux	Linux	Linux swap space (corresponds with 42h)
82h			No	Swap	Linux	GNU/Hurd	GNU/Hurd (Hurd uses the same Linux swap file system)
82h			x86	Container	Sun Microsystems		Solaris x86 (for Sun disklabels up to 2005) (see BFh)
83h			Yes	File system	Linux	Linux	Any native Linux file system (see 93h, corresponds with 43h)
83h			Yes	File system	Linux	GNU/Hurd	GNU/Hurd (Hurd and GRUB use the same Linux ext2 file system to run and it no longer supports UFS file system, corresponds with 63h)
84h			No	Hibernation	Microsoft	?	APM hibernation (suspend to disk, S2D)
84h				Hidden FS	IBM	OS/2	Hidden C: (FAT16)(corresponds to either 04h or 06h)
84h				Hibernation	Intel	Rapid Start technology	Rapid Start hibernation data (possibly iFFS; possibly used for Intel SRT SSD cache as well)
85h			No, AAP	Container	Linux	Linux	Linux extended (corresponds with 05h)
86h				File system	Microsoft	Windows NT 4 Server	Fault-tolerant FAT16B mirrored volume set (see B6h and C6h, corresponds with 06h)
86h				Service	Linux	Linux	Linux RAID superblock with auto-detect (old) (see FDh)
87h				File system	Microsoft	Windows NT 4 Server	Fault-tolerant HPFS/NTFS mirrored volume set (see B7h and C7h, corresponds with 07h)
88h				Service	Linux	Linux	Linux plaintext partition table
8Ah				Service	Martin Kiewitz	AirBoot	AirBoot is a track0 Boot Manager with on-the-fly partition detection
8Bh				File system	Microsoft	Windows NT 4 Server	Legacy fault-tolerant FAT32 mirrored volume set (see BBh and CBh, corresponds with 0Bh)
8Ch				File system	Microsoft	Windows NT 4 Server	Legacy fault-tolerant FAT32 mirrored volume set (see BCh and CCh, corresponds with 0Ch)
8Dh	MBR, EBR	CHS, LBA	x86, 68000, 8080/Z80	Hidden FS	FreeDOS	Free FDISK	Hidden FAT12 (corresponds with 01h) (Note: Used by Free FDISK of FreeDOS: 8Dh, 90h, 91h, 92h, 97h, 98h, 9Ah, 9Bh.)
8Eh				Container	Linux	Linux	Linux LVM since 1999 (see FEh)
90h	MBR, EBR	CHS, LBA	x86, 68000, 8080/Z80	Hidden FS	FreeDOS	Free FDISK	Hidden FAT16 (corresponds with 04h)
91h	MBR, EBR	CHS, LBA	No, AAP	Hidden container	FreeDOS	Free FDISK	Hidden extended partition with CHS addressing (corresponds with 05h)
92h	MBR, EBR	CHS, LBA	x86	Hidden FS	FreeDOS	Free FDISK	Hidden FAT16B (corresponds with 06h)
93h				File system	Andrew S. Tanenbaum	Amoeba	Amoeba native file system
93h				Hidden FS		Linux	Hidden Linux file system (see 83h)
94h				Service	Andrew S. Tanenbaum	Amoeba	Amoeba bad block table
95h				File system	MIT	EXOPC	EXOPC native
96h			PowerPC	File system	IBM, Apple	CHRP	ISO-9660 file system
97h	MBR, EBR	CHS, LBA	x86	Hidden FS	FreeDOS	Free FDISK	Hidden FAT32 (corresponds with 0Bh)
98h	MBR, EBR	LBA	x86	Hidden FS	FreeDOS	Free FDISK	Hidden FAT32 (corresponds with 0Ch)
98h	MBR	CHS, LBA	x86	Service FS	Datalight	ROM-DOS	Service partition (bootable FAT) ROM-DOS SuperBoot (see 12h)
98h	MBR	CHS, LBA	x86	Service FS	Intel	?	Service partition (bootable FAT) (see 12h)
99h				File system	?	?	Early Unix
9Ah	MBR, EBR	LBA	x86	Hidden FS	FreeDOS	Free FDISK	Hidden FAT16 (corresponds with 0Eh)
9Bh	MBR, EBR	LBA	No, AAP	Hidden container	FreeDOS	Free FDISK	Hidden extended partition with LBA (corresponds with 0Fh)
9Eh				File system	Andy Valencia	VSTa	
9Eh				File system	Andy Valencia	ForthOS	ForthOS (eForth port)
9Fh				?	?	BSD/OS 3.0+, BSDI	(see B7h and B8h)
A0h	MBR			Service FS	Hewlett-Packard	?	Diagnostic partition for HP laptops
A0h				Hibernation	Phoenix, IBM, Toshiba, Sony	?	Hibernate partition
A1h				?	Hewlett-Packard	HP Volume Expansion	
A1h				Hibernation	Phoenix, NEC	?	Hibernate partition
A2h	MBR	CHS, LBA	ARM	Image	Altera	Cyclone V	Hard Processor System (HPS) ARM preloader
A3h				?	Hewlett-Packard	HP Volume Expansion	
A4h				?	Hewlett-Packard	HP Volume Expansion	
A5h	MBR			Container	FreeBSD	BSD	BSD slice (BSD/386, 386BSD, NetBSD (before 1998-02-19), FreeBSD)
A6h				?	Hewlett-Packard	HP Volume Expansion	
A6h	MBR			Container	OpenBSD	OpenBSD	OpenBSD slice
A7h			386	File system	NeXT	NeXTSTEP	
A8h				File system	Apple	Darwin, Mac OS X	Apple Darwin, Mac OS X UFS (Note: Apple Mac OS X uses partition IDs A8h, ABh, ACh, and AFh.)
A9h	MBR			Container	NetBSD	NetBSD	NetBSD slice
AAh	MBR	CHS	?	File system	Olivetti	MS-DOS	Olivetti MS-DOS FAT12 (1.44 MB) (corresponds with 06h)
ABh			Yes	Service	Apple	Darwin, Mac OS X	Apple Darwin, Mac OS X boot
ABh				File system	Stanislav Karchebny	GO! OS	GO!
ACh			Yes	Service	Apple	Darwin, Mac OS X	Apple RAID, Mac OS X RAID
ADh				File system	Ben Avison, Acorn	RISC OS	ADFS / FileCore format
AEh			x86	File system	Frank Barrus	ShagOS	ShagOS file system
AFh			?	File system	Apple	Mac OS X	HFS and HFS+
AFh			No	Swap	Frank Barrus	ShagOS	ShagOS swap
B0h	MBR	CHS, LBA	x86	Blocker	Star-Tools	Boot-Star	Boot-Star dummy partition
B1h				?	Hewlett-Packard	HP Volume Expansion	
B1h				File system	QNX Software Systems	QNX 6.x	QNX Neutrino power-safe file system
B2h				File system	QNX Software Systems	QNX 6.x	QNX Neutrino power-safe file system
B3h				?	Hewlett-Packard	HP Volume Expansion	
B3h				File system	QNX Software Systems	QNX 6.x	QNX Neutrino power-safe file system
B4h				?	Hewlett-Packard	HP Volume Expansion	
B6h				?	Hewlett-Packard	HP Volume Expansion	
B6h	EBR			File system	Microsoft	Windows NT 4 Server	Corrupted fault-tolerant FAT16B mirrored master volume (see C6h and 86h, corresponds with 06h)
B7h				File system		BSDI (before 3.0)	BSDI native file system / swap (see B8h and 9Fh)
B7h	EBR			File system	Microsoft	Windows NT 4 Server	Corrupted fault-tolerant HPFS/NTFS mirrored master volume (see C7h and 87h, corresponds with 07h)
B8h				File system		BSDI (before 3.0)	BSDI swap / native file system (see B7h and 9Fh)
BBh				Hidden FS	PhysTechSoft, Acronis, SWsoft	BootWizard, OS Selector	PTS BootWizard 4 / OS Selector 5 for hidden partitions other than 01h, 04h, 06h, 07h, 0Bh, 0Ch, 0Eh and unformatted partitions
BBh	MBR			Service FS	Acronis	Acronis True Image	OEM Secure Zone (corresponds to BCh)
BBh	EBR			File system	Microsoft	Windows NT 4 Server	Corrupted fault-tolerant FAT32 mirrored master volume (see CBh and 8Bh, corresponds with 0Bh)
BCh	EBR			File system	Microsoft	Windows NT 4 Server	Corrupted fault-tolerant FAT32 mirrored master volume (see CCh and 8Ch, corresponds with 0Ch)
BCh	MBR	LBA		Service FS	Acronis	Acronis True Image	Acronis Secure Zone
BCh	MBR, EBR			Service FS	Paragon Software Group	Backup Capsule	Backup Capsule
BDh				File system	?	BonnyDOS/286	
BEh			Yes	File system	Sun Microsystems	Solaris 8	Solaris 8 boot
BFh			x86	Container	Sun Microsystems	Solaris	Solaris x86 (for Sun disklabels, since 2005) (see 82h)
C0h	MBR	CHS, LBA	x86	Secured container	Novell, IMS	DR-DOS, Multiuser DOS, REAL/32	Secured FAT partition (smaller than 32 MB) (Note: Versions of DR DOS 6.0 and higher use several of these partition IDs for secured FAT partitions with single-user security: C0h, C1h, C4h, C5h, C6h, CBh, CCh, CEh, CFh.) (Note: Versions of IMS REAL/32 use partition IDs C0h and D0h for multi-user security.)
C1h	MBR, EBR	CHS, LBA	x86	Secured FS	Digital Research	DR DOS 6.0+	Secured FAT12 (corresponds with 01h)
C2h			Yes	Hidden FS	BlueSky Innovations	Power Boot	Hidden Linux native file system
C3h			No	Hidden swap	BlueSky Innovations	Power Boot	Hidden Linux swap
C4h	MBR, EBR	CHS, LBA	x86	Secured FS	Digital Research	DR DOS 6.0+	Secured FAT16 (corresponds with 04h)
C5h	MBR, EBR	CHS, LBA	No, AAP	Secured container	Digital Research	DR DOS 6.0+	Secured extended partition with CHS addressing (corresponds with 05h)
C6h	MBR, EBR	CHS, LBA	x86	Secured FS	Digital Research	DR DOS 6.0+	Secured FAT16B (corresponds with 06h)
C6h	EBR			File system	Microsoft	Windows NT 4 Server	Corrupted fault-tolerant FAT16B mirrored slave volume (see B6h and 86h, corresponds with 06h)
C7h	MBR		Yes	File system		Syrinx	Syrinx boot
C7h	EBR			File system	Microsoft	Windows NT 4 Server	Corrupted fault-tolerant HPFS/NTFS mirrored slave volume (see B7h and 87h, corresponds with 07h)
C8h					?		Reserved for DR-DOS since 1997
C9h					?		Reserved for DR-DOS since 1997
CAh					?		Reserved for DR-DOS since 1997
CBh	MBR, EBR	CHS, LBA	x86	Secured FS	Caldera	DR-DOS 7.0x	Secured FAT32 (corresponds with 0Bh)
CBh	EBR			File system	Microsoft	Windows NT 4 Server	Corrupted fault-tolerant FAT32 mirrored slave volume (see BBh and 8Bh, corresponds with 0Bh)
CCh	MBR, EBR	LBA	x86	Secured FS	Caldera	DR-DOS 7.0x	Secured FAT32 (corresponds with 0Ch)
CCh	EBR			File system	Microsoft	Windows NT 4 Server	Corrupted fault-tolerant FAT32 mirrored slave volume (see BCh and 8Ch, corresponds with 0Ch)
CDh			No	Service	Convergent Technologies, Unisys	CTOS	Memory dump (see DDh and DBh)
CDh	MBR	LBA	x86	File system	openSUSE	Linux	openSUSE ISOHybrid ISO9660 partition (from openSUSE Leap "Live" x86 images)
CEh	MBR, EBR	LBA	x86	Secured FS	Caldera	DR-DOS 7.0x	Secured FAT16B (corresponds with 0Eh)
CFh	MBR, EBR	LBA	No, AAP	Secured container	Caldera	DR-DOS 7.0x	Secured extended partition with LBA (corresponds with 0Fh)
D0h	MBR	CHS, LBA	386	Secured container	Novell, IMS	Multiuser DOS, REAL/32	Secured FAT partition (larger than 32 MB) (Note: Versions of Multiuser DOS use these partition IDs for secured FAT partitions with multi-user security: D0h, D1h, D4h, D5h, D6h.)
D1h	MBR, EBR	CHS	386	Secured FS	Novell	Multiuser DOS	Secured FAT12 (corresponds with 01h)
D4h	MBR, EBR	CHS	386	Secured FS	Novell	Multiuser DOS	Secured FAT16 (corresponds with 04h)
D5h	MBR, EBR	CHS	No	Secured container	Novell	Multiuser DOS	Secured extended partition with CHS addressing (corresponds with 05h)
D6h	MBR, EBR	CHS	386	Secured FS	Novell	Multiuser DOS	Secured FAT16B (corresponds with 06h)
D8h	MBR	CHS		File system	Digital Research	CP/M-86	CP/M-86 (see DBh)
DAh			No	Service	John Hardin		Non-file system data
DAh				Secured FS	DataPower	Powercopy Backup	Shielded disk
DBh	MBR	CHS	x86	File system	Digital Research	CP/M-86, Concurrent CP/M-86, Concurrent DOS	(see D8h)
DBh				?	Convergent Technologies, Unisys	CTOS	? (see CDh and DDh)
DBh			x86	Service	KDG Telemetry	D800	boot image for x86 supervisor CPU (SCPU) module
DBh	MBR	CHS, LBA	x86	Service FS	Dell	DRMK	FAT32 system restore partition (DSR) (see DEh)
DDh			No	Service	Convergent Technologies, Unisys	CTOS	Hidden memory dump (see CDh and DBh)
DEh	MBR	CHS, LBA	x86	Hidden FS	Dell		FAT16 utility/diagnostic partition
DFh				?	Data General	DG/UX	DG/UX virtual disk manager
DFh	MBR			Blocker	TeraByte Unlimited	BootIt	EMBRM
DFh				?	?	Aviion	
E0h				File system	STMicroelectronics		ST AVFS
E1h	MBR	CHS		File system	Storage Dimensions	SpeedStor	FAT12 (≤16 MB) (corresponds to 01h)
E3h				File system	Storage Dimensions	SpeedStor	Read-only FAT12 (corresponds to E1h)
E4h	MBR	CHS		File system	Storage Dimensions	SpeedStor	FAT16 (≤32 MB) (corresponds to 04h)
E5h	MBR	CHS	x86	File system	Tandy	Tandy MS-DOS	Logical sectored FAT12 or FAT16
E6h				File System	Storage Dimensions	SpeedStor	Read-only FAT16 (corresponds to E4h)
E8h	MBR, EBR	CHS, LBA	No	Service	Linux	LUKS	Linux Unified Key Setup
EBh			386	File system	Be Inc.	BeOS, Haiku	BFS (see 2Ah and 2Bh)
ECh				File system	Robert Szeleney	SkyOS	SkyFS
EDh	MBR, EBR	CHS, LBA	x86	Service	Matthias R. Paul	Sprytix	EDC loader
EDh	MBR	CHS, LBA	x86		Hewlett-Packard	EFI	Was proposed for GPT hybrid MBR (Note: Was suggested in now-superseded T13 EDD 4 proposal e09127r1 (2009). The successor e09127r3 (2010) now recommends to use a normal partition type (the one that a legacy OS would see) instead of this special value.)
EEh	MBR		No	Blocker	Microsoft	EFI	GPT protective MBR (see EFh)
EFh	MBR			Service FS	Intel	EFI	EFI system partition. Can be a FAT12, FAT16, FAT32 (or other) file system (see EEh)
F0h		CHS		Service		Linux	PA-RISC Linux boot loader; must reside in first physical 2 GB
F2h	MBR	CHS	x86	File system	Sperry IT, Unisys, Digital Research	Sperry IT MS-DOS 3.x, Unisys MS-DOS 3.3, Digital Research DOS Plus 2.1	Logical sectored FAT12 or FAT16 secondary partition
F4h	MBR	CHS		File system	Storage Dimensions	SpeedStor	FAT16B (corresponds to 06h)
F4h				File system	Prologue S.A.	Prologue	Single volume partition for NGF or TwinFS
F5h				Container	Prologue S.A.	Prologue	MD0-MD9 multi volume partition for NGF or TwinFS
F6h	MBR			File system	Storage Dimensions	SpeedStor	Read-only FAT16B (corresponds to F4h)
F7h				File system	Natalia Portillo	O.S.G.	EFAT
F7h				File system	DDRdrive	X1	Solid State file system
F8h	MBR			Service	Arm	Arm EBBR 1.0	Protective partition for the area containing system firmware
F9h				Cache	ALC Press	Linux	pCache ext2/ext3 persistent cache
FBh			No	File system	VMware	VMware ESX	VMware VMFS file system partition
FCh			No	Swap	VMware	VMware ESX	VMware swap / VMKCORE kernel dump partition
FDh				Service	Linux	Linux	Linux RAID superblock with auto-detect (see 86h)
FEh				Service	IBM	PS/2	PS/2 IML partition
FEh	MBR	CHS, LBA	x86	Service FS	IBM	PS/2	PS/2 recovery partition (FAT12 reference disk floppy image), (corresponds with 01h if activated, all other partitions +10h then)
FEh				Service	Linux	Linux	Old Linux LVM (see 8Eh)
FFh	MBR	CHS	No	Service	Microsoft	XENIX	XENIX bad block table (see 02h and 03h)

== See also ==
- Disk partitioning § PC partition types
- Extended Boot Record (EBR)
- GUID Partition Table (GPT)
- List of file systems
- Rigid Disk Block (RDB)
