= Boot folder =

Directory in Unix-like operating systems

In Unix-like operating systems, a boot folder is the directory which holds files used in booting the operating system, typically /boot. The usage is standardized within Linux in the Filesystem Hierarchy Standard.

== Contents ==
The contents are mostly Linux kernel files or boot loader files, depending on the boot loader, most commonly (on Linux) LILO or GRUB.

=== Linux ===
- vmlinux – the Linux kernel
- initrd.img – a temporary file system, used prior to loading the kernel
- System.map – a symbol lookup table

=== LILO ===
LILO creates and uses the following files:

- map – a key file, which records where files needed by LILO during boot are stored. Following kernel upgrades, this file must be regenerated by running the "map installer", which is /sbin/lilo otherwise the system will not boot.
- boot.xxyy – these 512-byte files are backups of boot sectors, either the master boot record (MBR) or volume boot record (VBR), created when LILO overwrites a boot sector. xx and yy are the major and minor device numbers in hex; for example, the drive sda has numbers 8, 0, hence its MBR is backed up to boot.0800 while the partition sda3 has numbers 8,3, hence its VBR is backed up to boot.0803.

LILO may also use other files, such as message and also stores a non-boot configuration file in /etc/lilo.conf.

=== GRUB ===
GRUB stores its files in the subdirectory grub/ (i.e. /boot/grub/). These files are mostly modules (.mod), with configuration stored in grub.cfg.

== Location ==
/boot/ is often simply a directory on the main (or only) hard drive partition. However, it may be a separate partition. A separate partition is generally only used when bootloaders are incapable of reading the main filesystem (e.g. LILO does not recognize XFS) or other problems not easily resolvable by users.

On UEFI systems, including most modern PCs, the EFI system partition is often mounted at /boot/, /efi/ or /boot/efi/.
