= Plop Boot Manager =

Bootloader for personal computer

The Plop Boot Manager is a proprietary bootloader written by Elmar Hanlhofer. Plop Boot Manager can make computers boot from media that the original BIOS has no support for, such as USB or IDE CD/DVDs. Optionally, Plop can be installed directly onto the hard disk of a computer.
