= Ontrack (disambiguation) =

Ontrack or ONTRACK may refer to:

- ONTRACK, former trading name for New Zealand Railways Corporation (NZRC), now KiwiRail Network
- OnTrack, a commuter railway in New York state, U.S.
- Ontrack, a computer data recovery company acquired by Kroll Inc. to form Kroll Ontrack
  - Ontrack software, author of the 1980s–90s computer utility suite Disk Manager for DOS
- OnTrac, a regional parcel carrier in the Western United States
- Ontrak Inc., a publicly traded healthcare company founded by Terren Peizer

== See also ==
- "On Track", a song from Tame Impala's 2020 studio album The Slow Rush
