= ASZ =

ASZ or Asz may refer to:

- Acronis Secure Zone, hard disk drive partition type
- Aktion Sühnezeichen (Action for Reconciliation), East German peace organization after World War II
- Also sprach Zarathustra (Thus Spoke Zarathustra), 1883 German philosophical novel by Friedrich Nietzsche
- Szalom Asz (1880–1957), Polish-American writer
- Ász, cigar brand
- -asz, Polish conjugation
- As language, ISO-639-3 code for the Raja Ampat language

== See also ==
- AS (disambiguation)
- SZ (disambiguation)
