= Partition alignment =

Proper alignment of partitions in data storage device

Partition alignment is the proper alignment of partitions to the boundaries available in a data storage device.

Examples include the following:

- 4 KB sector alignment with hard disk drives supporting Advanced Format (AF)
- Track partition alignment, partitions starting on track boundaries on hard disk drives
- Cylinder partition alignment, partitions starting on logical or physical cylinder boundaries on hard disk drives
- SSD partition alignment, partitions starting on NVM boundaries (with typically 4 KB to 1 MB in LBAs size) on SSDs and other flash-based memory devices
- RAID stripe alignment, partition alignment based on stripe boundaries

== See also ==
- Advanced Format
- Data striping
