= Acronis Secure Zone =

Hard disk partition type

Acronis Secure Zone is a hard disk partition type created and used by Acronis True Image as a backup storage target.

== Overview ==
Backup applications typically use network storage for storing backup archives, but this can be problematic when such resources are not available. Acronis designed a solution to this problem by carving off part of the local disk as a proprietary partition, which they refer to as Acronis Secure Zone. Since this partition is accessibly only by True Image and Backup & Recovery, it functions as a backup target safe from malware, user files, or other uses or corruption. Acronis True Image can manage only one Acronis Secure Zone per computer but can restore data off others (e.g., when a portable hard drive is connected).

== Technical Details ==
Although the Acronis Secure Zone has its own partition type, it is actually just a rebadged FAT32 partition labeled ACRONIS SZ, with "partition type" code set to 0xBC. Knowing these requirements, one can manually create and/or manage existing Acronis Secure Zone using any partition manager. Since the Acronis Secure Zone is just a modified FAT32 partition type, it is possible to gain direct access to this partition by changing its partition type code to 0x0B (FAT32 LBA).

Acronis True Image is designed to self-manage the backup archives stored to the Acronis Secure Zone. As such, all backup files are stored with autogenerated names in the root folder. If there is not enough free space for the next backup file, Acronis True Image will delete the oldest image set (base+incremental/differential files) in order to create space for the new files.

== Original Equipment Manufacturer Secure Zone ==
OEM versions of True Image are designed to use a special "Original Equipment Manufacturer secure zone", which is technically the same as a regular Acronis Secure Zone, but uses a partition type of 0xBB, and typically contains only a single image file with the "factory default" operating system and application configuration set forth by the manufacturer.
