= Disk Manager =

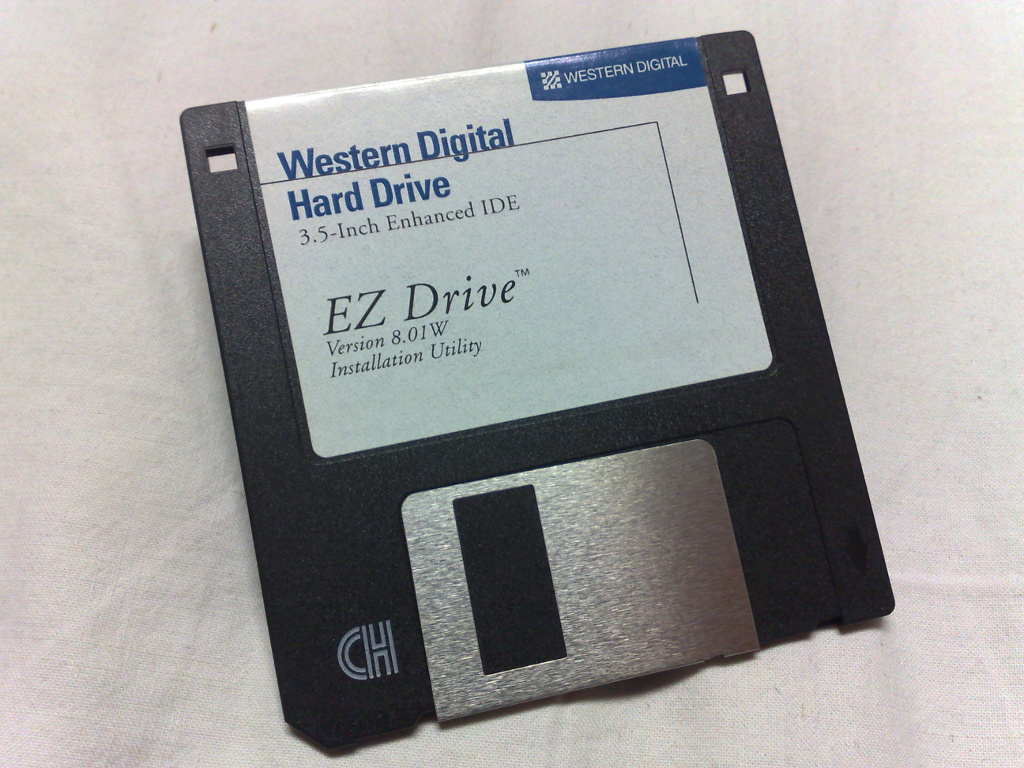
Installation of the Western Digital's EZ Drive, on a 3.5-inch floppy disk.

Disk Manager is a discontinued software (that was a popular 1980s and 1990s) and documentation package for MS-DOS and PC DOS computers, useful for self-installing personal computer hard disks. It was written by Ontrack, a company that is now part of KLDiscovery.

Installation covered different aspects:

- explaining personal computer hardware concepts
- documenting switches of many of the existing disks
- putting into place custom device drivers which circumvented BIOS limitations, notably those related to maximum disk or partition size and logical block addressing
- providing testing and informational utilities

Drivers could be either DOS-type, or replacement master boot record code.

Diskettes with Disk Manager were provided by some disk manufacturers (e.g. IBM), in custom OEM versions, supporting all of their models.

Not long after launching in 1985, Ontrack also started providing computer disk data recovery services as Ontrack Data Recovery.

== Version history ==
Version 5.0 for Windows was released on 2004-06-23. It includes DOS versions of Ontrack Disk Manager and Ontrack Data Recovery.

== Competing products ==
Other products that, like Disk Manager from OnTrack Computer Systems, perform hard drive geometry translation to circumvent BIOS limitations:

- SpeedStor from Storage Dimensions
- EZ-Drive from Micro House (also distributed by Western Digital)
