= Storage Dimensions =

Defunct American data storage company

Storage Dimensions, Inc.
- Company type: Public
- Founded: 1985; 41 years ago in Los Gatos, California, United States
- Founders: David A. Eeg; Gene E. Bowles
- Defunct: April 1998; 28 years ago
- Fate: Merged with Artecon, Inc.
- Products: Data storage hardware and software
- Parent: Maxtor (1987–1992)
- Website: storagedimensions.com at the Wayback Machine (archived 1996-12-05)

Storage Dimensions, Inc., was an American computer company active from 1985 to 1998 and based in Milpitas, California. The company sold data storage hardware—chiefly magnetic-tape- and hard-drive-based storage subsystems (with the hardware manufactured by other companies)—and developed server software for businesses. The company was perhaps best known for their SpeedStor disk utility software for MS-DOS and Windows. From 1987 to 1992, the company was a subsidiary of Maxtor.

== History ==
Storage Dimensions was founded by David A. Eeg and Gene E. Bowles in Los Gatos, California, in 1985. Both Eeg and Bowles had worked for Atasi Corporation, a San Jose–based maker of 5.25-inch hard disk drives that was acquired by Tandon in 1987. After leaving Atasi, the two founded Storage Dimensions with their own savings. The company's first product was the AT160F, a hard disk drive subsystem for the IBM Personal Computer AT and compatibles that comprised one or two 160-MB HDDs manufactured by Maxtor, a controller card with BIOS written by Award Software, and the company's SpeedStor disk utility software. It cost US$9,795 on its introduction in November 1986 for the two-HDD, 320-MB model, or $5,975 for the one-HDD, 160-MB model. The AT160F was one of the largest HDD subsystems available for the IBM PC at the time, allowing these computers to install graphics-heavy applications such as CAD/CAM and illustration software packages which were previously the domain of expensive minicomputers and Unix workstations.

Storage Dimensions continued to consult Maxtor for succeeding products, and in June 1987, Maxtor acquired Storage Dimensions outright, for an undisclosed sum. Following the buyout, Maxtor moved the company's headquarters to Milpitas, California. Maxtor folded U.S. Design Corporation, a company they had acquired earlier in the year, into Storage Dimensions while retaining the latter name for this division. By the end of 1987, Storage Dimensions had generated $18 million on sales of its high-performance, high-capacity HDD subsystems. In the summer of 1988, they introduced the SpeedStor AT650E, which was the highest-capacity 5.25-inch disk drive for the IBM PC up to that point in time, with a storage capacity of 651 MB. The company simultaneously released the LANStor LAN650E, a version of the SpeedStor AT650E optimized for file servers running Novell's NetWare network operating system.

By 1992, Storage Dimensions had grown to $80 million in sales under the auspices of Maxtor. That year, Maxtor spun off Storage Dimensions into an independent company, after which the company began focusing on RAID storage systems, tape backup products, and network storage management software and other server software. In April 1998, Storage Dimensions merged with Artecon, Inc., a Unix systems integrator founded in 1984 and based in San Diego, adopting the name of the latter company.
