= Ranish Partition Manager =

Computer software

Ranish Partition Manager is a freeware hard disk partition editor, disk cloning utility, and boot manager, that gives a high level of control for creating multi-boot systems. It is available on the freeware live CD SystemRescueCD and the Ultimate Boot CD (not the Windows version). It runs under MS-DOS, PC DOS, DR-DOS, or FreeDOS.

== Features ==
=== Partitioning ===
- Unlike the partition editor bundled with Windows Vista and Windows 7, Ranish Partition Manager can make partition tables where both Windows XP and Windows Vista can be installed. However, it is possible to make a partition table with no errors in RPM, where the Windows XP installer cannot install XP (without deleting the extended partition value from the partition table). Editing this type of partition table with Vista's partition editor will result in mixed alignments.
- Any number of changes can be made before saving to disk.
- The latest beta (v2.44 beta) provides a workaround to overcome the limitation of 4 primary partitions in a single drive, thus permitting up to 30 primary (and therefore bootable) partitions.
- Allows sector-precise editing of primary partitions, logical drives, and EBR extended partitions (type 05). A particularly rare feature of RPM is that it shows exactly where extended boot records are, advises the user of where they should be, and allows the user to put them anywhere.
  - RPM may show an error if the EBRs are not on the beginning of a head (relative to the beginning of the extended partition—type 0F). If partition alignments of this sort, are ignored, and the partition is edited by Windows XP disk manager, XP may delete the logical drives. This can happen if the extended partition is first edited by Windows Vista or Windows 7.
- Because RPM shows all of this information and shows the entire drive in a CHS format, it is easy to see whether the entire extended and primary partition tables, conform to a standard CHS alignment.
  - If a partition table does not follow a consistent CHS alignment (or maybe even if it does), and a Vista partition is resized or imaged, using certain tools, these tools may "correct" the start of the partition (sometimes by placing it on a cylinder (or track?) boundary) and making it unbootable. (source)
  - This also makes it easy to write down the location of a partition (in cylinders), delete it from the partition table, and later re-add it to the partition table, to make the partition visible again. This is used in multi-boot systems, where more than four primary partitions are required.
    - Using this technique it is possible to convert logical drives to primary partitions and vice versa. This is an experimental technique that may have problems in certain situations (see section below).
    - That technique only works with primary partitions. In order to install Windows XP it may be necessary to delete the extended partition from the partition table (in the master boot record). However, if you delete the extended partition value in the master boot record then you try to add it back, RPM will delete the first extended boot record. Instead, this can be done with a disk editor such as hexedit on System Rescue CD. The value for the extended partition is copied to a file and deleted from the partition table. After installing Windows XP, the extended partition value is copied back and the extended partition becomes visible to Windows.

=== Cloning ===
RPM can create bit-identical partition clones. (See Speed.)

=== Speed ===
RPM runs instantly from any of the following:

- SystemRescueCD (at the first prompt select "Run system tools from floppy disk image" (version 1.6.0)). As of version 2.8.1 and above SystemRescueCD does not include RPM anymore.
- RPM can be installed to a floppy disk from the TUI (it does not require use of the command line as is required to save a text file of the partition table).
- RPM can be installed to a hard drive.

Aside from tools that can be run from the regularly used operating system, RPM is one of the fastest ways to partition a hard disk, or to restore, clone, or move an operating system.

== Limitations and workarounds ==
RPM has not been updated for many years. (It is unknown whether it works with a dynamic disk or a large sector drive.) It has some quirks and display problems, most of which occur when using drives that are much larger than when RPM was written:

- Formatting partitions with RPM sometimes seemed to result in problems in Windows XP.
- It can display a maximum of 64 lines. This makes it impossible to add a partition when the partition table has approximately 3 primary partitions, plus an "extended partition" with 28 logical drives. Logical drives require two lines minimum. Free spaces between drives usually use a line each.
- On one system, the max cylinder value that could be entered "manually" was 65535. Higher numbers could be entered by using the wizard (press "enter" to run the wizard). The values can always be reduced using the "-" key.
  - Re-sizing the beginning of the extended partition (type 0x0F) can only be done manually so the beginning of the extended partition could not be re-sized beyond cylinder 65535. Take for example a disk (and partition table) that uses a sector size of 512 bytes, a head size of 63 sectors, and the largest (and probably the most common) cylinder size, that is, 255 heads per cylinder. On this disk, Ranish PM could re-size the beginning of the extended partition, to anywhere less than about 502 GiB from the beginning of the disk. On a disk that is the same except the cylinder size is 240 heads per cylinder, the maximum location for the start of the extended partition would be roughly 472 GiB. Generally the only time primary partitions are required (as opposed to logical drives) is to install certain operating systems (like Windows). 472 GiB is probably plenty of space for this purpose, even with multi-boot systems.
- The wizard has a quirk where the last character of the cylinder value may be displayed incorrectly when the value is changed. If this is ignored it seems to work fine.
- It can usually be used with partitions that do not follow a single CHS alignment, but this can be awkward for these reasons:
  - RPM allows the partition table to be viewed as CHS or sectors. In sector mode, drives over maybe 250 GB or so, have so many sectors they push the lines to the next line on the display. And the cursor does not appear in the correct place.
  - If you only know the sector you want the partition on, you may need to convert this to a CHS value for this reason: In sector mode, the max size possible to create a partition in sectors, was somewhere over 268,435,433 but under 268,435,550. Partitions of at least one terabyte have been created, when entering the values in cylinders (in CHS mode using the wizard).
    - But in CHS mode it doesn't allow just any head or sector address to be typed in. The "-" and "+" keys can raise or lower these values, when they can't be typed in.
- cannot format some filesystems or display their volume labels e.g. NTFS

== Backup of a primary partition table and extended partition ==
Ranish Partition Manager can be used to create a (manual) backup of both the primary partition table and the "extended partition" (table).

== Converting logical drives to primary partitions and vice versa ==
Using RPM it is possible to convert logical drives to primary partitions. In RPM this is done by "deleting" the logical drive, moving the beginning of the "extended partition" (type 0x0F) forward, recreating a primary "partition" in the same location as the logical drive, then saving the changes. The process is reversed to convert a primary partition to a logical drive. However, before or after these conversions the partition must deviate from a standard CHS alignment, because logical drives usually start on the second head (head 1) while primary partitions usually start at the beginning of a cylinder.

Most modern operating systems probably would not have problems reading and editing the files on a converted drive but some software used for re-sizing or imaging partitions, may decide to silently "correct" the partition by moving the beginning of the partition (perhaps to conform to a standard CHS alignment) or to conform to a 1-MiB alignment. This re-sizing would not prevent Windows XP from booting, but it might prevent Windows Vista from booting, if the starting sector is moved without updating Vista's boot files. Secondly, if the user is unaware that the partition has been moved, they may not realize that an old backup of the partition table, will be obsolete.

However, there is another possible problem with converting primary partitions into logical drives, unless the primary partitions are made for this purpose. Windows XP Disk Management is known to delete "nonstandard" extended partitions. There must be at least 63 sectors before the primary partition, to allocate for an EBR, in order to make the conversion. For these reasons, it may be preferable, for any primary partition which may be converted to an extended partition, to start them on head 1, instead of at the beginning of the cylinder. The space from the beginning of this cylinder, to head 1, should be free space; the previous partition should end at the end of the last complete cylinder (or at the end of an earlier cylinder).

Starting primary partitions on head 1 (instead of head 0) has another advantage. It allows bit-identical cloning of these primary partitions, to logical drives, making completely normal (usual) logical drives. That is, the EBRs of the logical drives are at the beginning of a cylinder, the logical drive begins on the very next head, and the logical drive ends on a cylinder boundary. However this author has not tested installing or booting operating systems from primary partitions beginning on the head 1, which were not the first partition. (The first partition usually begins on head 1 because this cylinder begins with the master boot record.)

== Comparison with other partition editors ==
Like most graphical partition editors, GParted is not sector-precise, meaning it will not show the numbers of the sectors or cylinders where partitions are being created. However, it does a few things RPM cannot: GParted can resize partitions with data on them (NTFS, FAT, etc.) and it can format NTFS partitions. Although RPM is able to format FAT partitions, Windows XP had an error on a partition formatted with RPM.

Ranish Partition Manager and GNU Parted (parted) can display all partitions in one CHS format, and both are sector precise, but parted does not show the locations of the EBRs or all the values they contain. In Linux, all this information can be displayed by using sfdisk -us -l -x but the format requires more scrutinizing and doesn't indicate errors/warnings with color, as RPM does. Unlike the command line tools parted or sfdisk, RPMs text user interface allows the user to move the cursor anywhere on the partition table to select what values to change. Parted is riskier and less efficient to use, because it saves every change as soon as it is made, and it takes time to update certain things.

RPM can create partitions manually or using a wizard.

== See also ==
- KDE Partition Manager
- List of disk partitioning software
- PartitionMagic
