= FIPS (computer program) =

- Developer: Arno Schäfer
- Stable release: 2.0 / May 11, 1998; 28 years ago
- Operating system: MS-DOS
- Type: Disk partitioning
- License: GPL
- Website: bmrc.berkeley.edu/people/chaffee/fips/fips.html

FIPS (First nondestructive Interactive Partition Splitter) - is an MS-DOS program for non-destructive splitting of File Allocation Table (FAT) hard disk partitions.

Splitting partitions is an alternative to deleting the partitions and creating new ones using software such as fdisk, the advantage of which is that the data is not lost. The most common use is installing multiple operating systems on a single computer.

FIPS is free software, licensed under the GNU General Public License (GPL).

== Limitations ==
FIPS only works on primary partitions that are formatted using the File Allocation Table (FAT) filesystem. Most new machines with Windows pre-installed use NTFS, leaving FIPS obsolete for its intended purpose of resizing existing Windows installations to install Linux. In addition, FIPS cannot grow partitions due to technical limitations with the design, and partitions shrunk with it have some wasted space since it does not shrink the File Allocation Table. The filesystem to be shrunk must also be defragmented before FIPS is run— since FIPS does not move data, any data near the end of the partition prevents it from being resized.

== Alternatives ==
These limitations have caused it to be largely superseded by more modern tools with better filesystem support, more advanced resizing methods and more complete partitioning functionality, such as:

- GNU Parted
  - GParted is a GTK+-based graphical version of Parted
  - QtParted is a Qt-based graphical version of Parted
  - Parted Magic
- PartitionMagic
- fdisk
- cfdisk
- diskpart

== See also ==
- gpart
- TestDisk
