= Disk Utility =

Disk utility for macOS

- Disk Utility running on macOS Big Sur
- Stable release: 22.7
- Operating system: macOS
- Type: Utility
- Website: support.apple.com/guide/disk-utility/welcome/mac

Disk Utility is a system utility for performing disk and disk volume-related tasks on macOS.

Features include:

- Create, convert, backup, compress, and encrypt logical volume images from a wide range of formats to .dmg or, for CD/DVD images, .cdr
- Mount, unmount and eject disk volumes (including hard disks, removable media, and disk volume images)
- Enable or disable journaling
- Verify a disk's integrity, and repair it if damaged (works for both Mac-compatible partitions and for FAT32 partitions with Windows installed)
- Erase, format, partition, and clone disks
- Securely delete free space or disk using a "zero out" data, a 7-pass DOD 5220-22 M standard, or a 35-pass Gutmann algorithm
- Add or change partition table between Apple Partition Map, GUID Partition Table, and master boot record (MBR)
- Restore volumes from Apple Software Restore (ASR) images
- Check the S.M.A.R.T. status of a hard disk

Disk Utility functions may also be accessed via the command line with commands diskutil and hdiutil. The commands also can create and manage RAM disk images.

== History ==
In the classic Mac OS, similar functionality to the verification features of Disk Utility could be found in the Disk First Aid application. Another application called Drive Setup was used for drive formatting and partitioning and the application Disk Copy was used for working with disk images.

Before Mac OS X Panther, the functionality of Disk Utility was spread across two applications: Disk Copy and Disk Utility. Disk Copy was used for creating and mounting disk image files whereas Disk Utility was used for formatting, partitioning, verifying, and repairing file structures. The ability to "zero" all data (multi-pass formatting) on a disk was not added until Mac OS X 10.2.3. Further changes introduced in Mac OS X Tiger, specifically version 10.4.3, allowed Disk Utility to be used to verify the file structure of the current boot drive. Mac OS X Leopard added the ability to create, resize, and delete disk partitions without erasing them, a feature known as live partitioning. In OS X El Capitan, Disk Utility has a different user interface and lost the abilities to repair permissions due to obsolescence, create and manage disks formatted as RAID, burn discs, and multi-pass format internal solid-state drives and encrypted external drives.

== See also ==
- Apple Software Restore
- Logical Disk Manager
- Palimpsest Disk Utility
- GNU Parted
- diskpart
- fdisk
- cfdisk
- sfdisk
