= Sfdisk =

Linux partition editor

sfdisk is a Linux partition editor. In contrast to fdisk and cfdisk, sfdisk is not interactive. All three programs are written in C and are part of the util-linux package of Linux utility programs.

Since sfdisk is command-driven instead of menu-driven, i.e., it reads input from standard input or from a file, it is generally used for partitioning drives from scripts or used by programs, like e.g. GParted and KDE Partition Manager.

The current sfdisk implementation uses the libfdisk library. sfdisk supports MBR (DOS), GPT, SUN and SGI disk labels, but it no longer provides any functionality for CHS (Cylinder-Head-Sector) addressing since version 2.26.

== See also ==
- format
- gpart
- parted, GParted
- diskpart
- List of disk partitioning software
