= QtParted =

Open-source partition editor

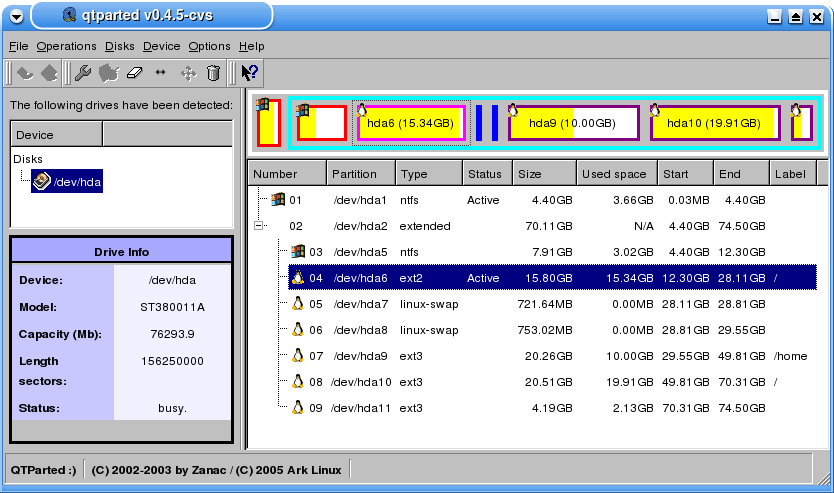
- QtParted 0.4.5
- Developers: Vanni Brutto, Bernhard Rosenkränzer
- Operating system: Linux
- Type: Partition editor
- License: GNU GPL
- Website: qtparted.sourceforge.net

QtParted is a Qt4 front-end to GNU Parted.

QtParted is a program for Linux which is used for creating, destroying, resizing and managing partitions. It uses the GNU Parted libraries and is built with the Qt4 toolkit. Like GNU Parted, it has inherent support for the resizing of NTFS partitions, using the ntfsresize utility. It does not handle LVM partitions.

The QtParted team does not provide an official Live CD to use QtParted with. However, QtParted is included in the live Linux distribution Knoppix, on the Kubuntu Live CD, in MEPIS, in NimbleX and in the Trinity Rescue Kit.

After not being maintained since 2005, it has been superseded by KDE Partition Manager. It has since been revived by the developers of the (now discontinued) Ark Linux distribution, and is still being maintained.

Reviews

== See also ==
- KDE Partition Manager
- Partition (computing)
- List of disk partitioning software
- GParted, the GTK+ counterpart of QtParted
