= List of disk partitioning software =

This is a list of utilities for performing disk partitioning.

== List ==
Name	Developer	Licensing	Maintained?	Platform	Last version release date
DFSee	Jan van Wijk	Proprietary software	Yes	DOS, Linux, macOS, OS/2, Windows NT family	2021-10-06
Disk Director	Acronis	Proprietary software	No	Windows	2023-03-04
DiskGenius	Eassos	Proprietary software	Yes	Windows	
Disk Utility	Apple	Proprietary software	Yes	macOS	
diskpart	Microsoft	Proprietary software	Yes	Windows NT family	
fdisk (FreeDOS)	Brian Reifsnyder	Free software	Yes	FreeDOS	
fdisk (Microsoft)	Microsoft	Proprietary software	No	MS-DOS, Windows	
fdisk (OS/2)	IBM	Proprietary software	Yes	OS/2	
fdisk (Unix-like)	util-linux project	Free software	Yes	Unix-like	
FIPS	Arno Schäfer	Free software	No	MS-DOS	1998-05-11
GNOME Disks	Red Hat	Free software	Yes	Linux	2024-09-03
GNU Parted CLI-only (GUIs: Gparted, QtParted)	The GParted Project	Free software	Yes	Linux	2026-09-24
GParted (GUI for GNU Parted)	The GParted Project	Free software	Yes	Linux (Live CD is independent)	2026-03-17
gdisk (GPT fdisk)	Roderick W. Smith	Free software	Yes	Linux, macOS, Windows	2018-07-05
KDE Partition Manager	Volker Lanz	Free software	Yes	Linux	2025-02-06
Logical Disk Manager	Microsoft	Proprietary software	Yes	Windows NT family	
MiniTool Partition Wizard	MiniTool Software Ltd.,	Trialware	Yes	Microsoft Windows	2026-07-07
ntfsresize	Szabolcs Szakacsits	Free software	Yes	Linux	
Parted Magic	Parted Magic LLC	Proprietary software	Yes	Linux	
Partition Commander	VCOM Products	Proprietary software	No	Windows	
PartitionMagic	Symantec	Proprietary software	No	Windows	
QtParted (GUI for GNU Parted)	Vanni Brutto	Free software	No	Linux	
Ranish Partition Manager	Mikhail Ranish	Freeware	No	MS-DOS, PC DOS, DR-DOS or FreeDOS	
Solaris format utility	Sun Microsystems	Proprietary software	No	Solaris	
