= SystemRescue =

Linux distribution

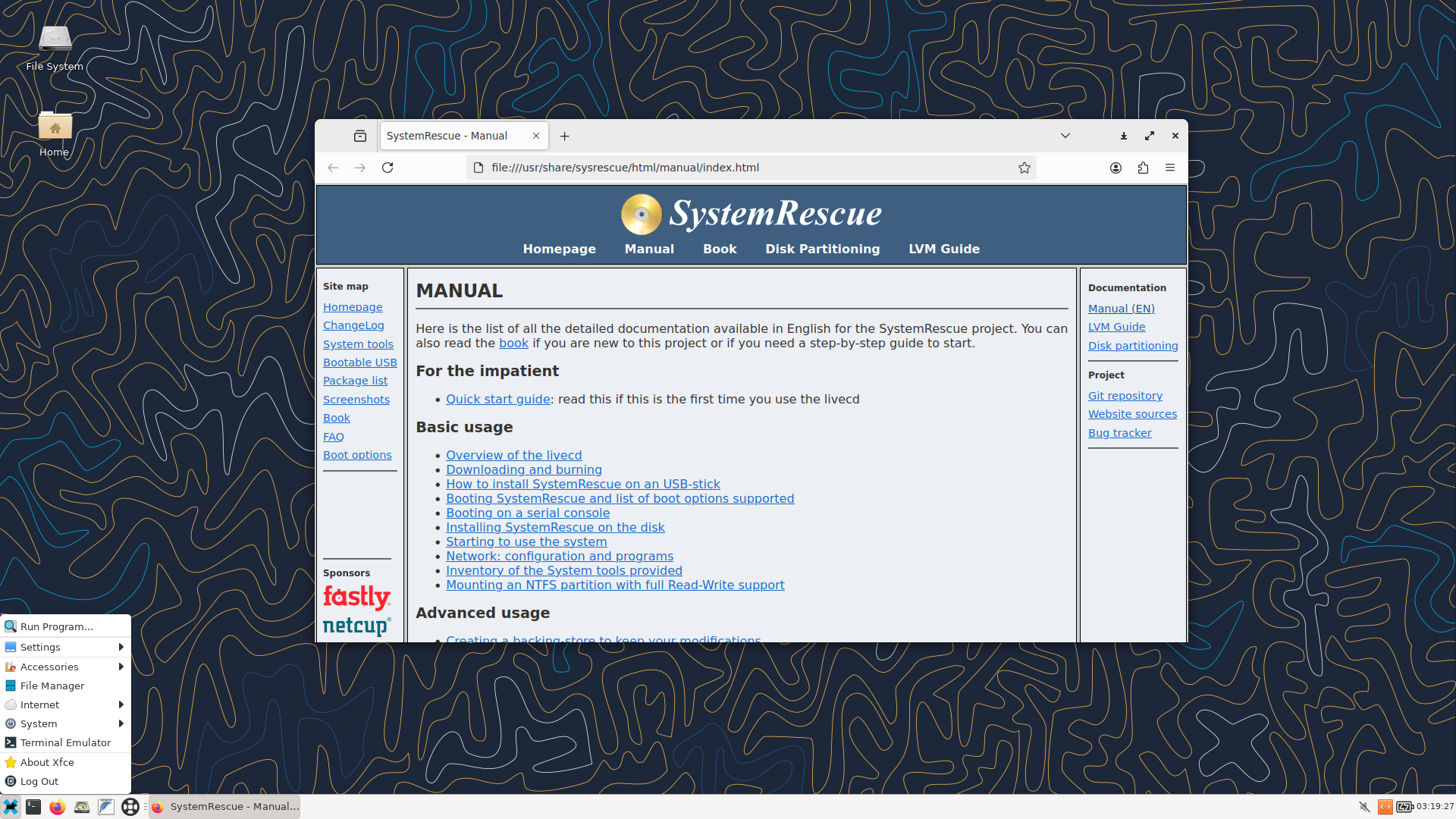
- SystemRescue v11.03 (2024-12-07) with the default desktop (XFCE) and the SystemRescue manual open
- Developer: François Dupoux
- OS family: Linux (Unix-like)
- Working state: Current
- Source model: Open source
- Latest release: 13.02 / 1 August 2026; 24 days ago
- Repository: gitlab.com/systemrescue/systemrescue-sources
- Available in: English and French
- Package manager: pacman
- Supported platforms: x86-64 previously: i686
- Kernel type: Monolithic (Linux)
- Default user interface: XFCE
- License: GPL-3
- Official website: www.system-rescue.org

SystemRescue (Previously known as "SystemRescueCD") is a Linux distribution for x86-64 and IA-32 computers. The primary purpose of SystemRescue is to repair unbootable or otherwise damaged computer systems after a system crash. SystemRescue is not intended to be used as a permanent operating system. It runs from a Live CD, a USB flash drive or any type of hard drive. It was designed by a team led by François Dupoux, and is based on Arch Linux since version 6.0. Starting with version 6.0, it has systemd as its init system.

== Requirements ==
For more recent versions, a 64-bit processor is required, with 32-bit processor support being discontinued with version 9.0.3 in 2022. PowerPC had a single release with version 0.2.0 in 2004, with SPARC also having one for version 0.4.0 in 2007.

If a PXE boot requires HTTP or TFTP, at least 1GB of memory will be needed for loading a required file for those into memory. However if NFS or NBD is used, the 1GB requirement isn't necessary. Running the live cd from memory is recommended for speed and not requiring the boot device to be connected after boot, however it does require installed memory to be at least 2GB. Bootable USBs have become preferred over CDs or DVDs due to the more recent size increases of the distribution and due to the lack of optical drives in many modern devices.

== Features ==
SystemRescue is capable of graphics using the Linux framebuffer option for tools such as GParted. It has options such as connecting to the Internet through an ADSL modem or Ethernet and graphical web browsers such as Mozilla Firefox.

The File systems supported by System-Rescue are btrfs, ext3, ext4, FAT16, FAT32, ISO9660, JFS, NTFS, ReiserFS, VFAT, XFS, and Bcachefs

There are two bootloaders supporting the OS: GRUB and SYSLINUX.

SystemRescue features include:

=== System tools ===
- Cryptsetup – software to encrypt and decrypt disks, supports the LUKS format.
- Disk Partitioning and management – GNU Parted and GParted (supports MBR and GPT)
- File system tools – btrfs-progs (btrfs), dosfstools (FAT family), e2fsprogs (ext2/ext3/ext4), NTFS-3G (NTFS)
- lvm – used for Logical Volume Management for accessing, modifying and deleting logical volumes.
- nvme-cli – used for NVMe SSD management
- nwipe – a secure data erasure tool (fork of DBAN) for hard drives to remove data remanence, supports Gutmann method plus other overwriting standard algorithms and patterns.
- Partition tables and disk management – fdisk, gdisk, cfdisk
- smartmontools – a S.M.A.R.T. suite for drive health reporting and data loss prevention
- Supports the use of Virtual Private Networks (using OpenVPN, Wireguard, OpenConnect)
- TestDisk – A tool to check, recover and repair partitions

=== Applications ===
- Anti-virus – ClamAV.
- Archives – Tar and p7zip (both provide support for gzip, xz, zstd, lz4, bzip2 formats), FSArchiver (compressed archives from file system content)
- CD/DVD burner – dvd+rw-tools, udftools
- Data Recovery software – Chntpw (Windows password reset), ddrescue (data recovery on damaged drives and listing damaged sectors), PartImage (disk imaging for used sectors), Photorec (media, documents and archive recovery)
- File managers – emelFM2, Midnight Commander, Thunar (uses XFCE desktop environment)
- Hex editors – hexedit (in terminal), ghex (GUI)
- FTP Clients – Lftp (ran from terminal)
- Password Manager – KeePassXC
- PGP Suite – GNU Privacy Guard
- SSH Client – OpenSSH
- Remote Access Tools – Remmina, rdesktop (for windows systems).
- Syncing and backups – Rsync (text-based), grsync (GUI), rclone.
- Serial console – Supports using Screen, Minicom and Picocom for networking via a serial interface.
- Text editors – vim, nano, qemacs and joe are text-based, while featherpad and geany have a GUI
- Web browsers – For a graphical browser Firefox is included, and for a text-based browser ELinks is included

=== Programming ===
- It uses the built-in Bash shell for commands and scripting.
- It also supports Perl, Python and Ruby for scripting or programming.

Additionally, the live cd also allows for booting to FreeDOS, Memtest86+, hardware diagnostics and the ability to create other boot disks from a single CD

== Burning CDs/DVDs and creating a bootable USB ==
The live cd iso file being installed needs to match the system being used; for 64-bit x86-64 processors amd64 is used, for 32-bit IA-32 processors i686 is used. The supported architecture is listed at the end of the iso filename.

The CD can also boot from a customized DVD which has almost 4.6 GB of free space for backed-up files. This makes it good for storing all the information that is needed from a hard drive and then formatting it. To burn the DVD, one must burn the image file first and then add all the separate files and folders. This should not affect the general way in which the DVD works. The DVD can then be used to insert those files into the hard drive using Midnight Commander.

The system-rescue iso can be used to create a bootable USB device using tools such as rufus, ventoy, or the dedicated linux tool. The USB must have at least 2GB of storage and be formatted in FAT32.

== See also ==
- Parted Magic
- List of bootable data recovery software
