= Nwipe =

Data erasure software

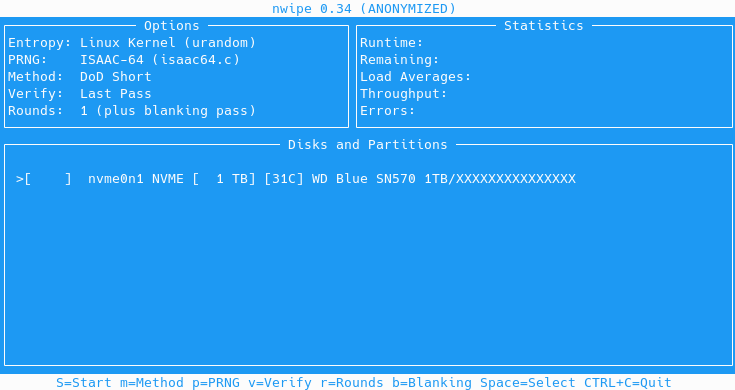
- Developer: Martijn van Brummelen
- Stable release: v0.43 / October 2, 2026; 10 days ago
- Operating system: Linux
- Platform: x86
- Available in: English
- Type: Secure erase
- License: GPLv2
- Website: github.com/martijnvanbrummelen/nwipe/
- Repository: github.com/martijnvanbrummelen/nwipe

nwipe is a Linux computer program used to securely erase data. It is maintained by Martijn van Brummelen and is free software, released under the GNU General Public License 2.0 licence. The program is a fork of the dwipe program that was previously incorporated in the DBAN secure erase disk.

nwipe was created to allow dwipe to be run outside DBAN, using any host distribution. It utilizes a simple text-based ncurses user interface or can be run directly from the command line. It is available as an installable package in the repositories of many Linux distributions, including Debian and Ubuntu.

nwipe was first released as version 0.17 on 20 October 2014.

== Erasing methods ==
nwipe can be set to use a number of different patterns, through the method selection:

- Default - DoD Short - The United States Department of Defense 5220.22-M short 3 pass wipe (passes 1, 2 & 7).
- Zero Fill - Fills the device with zeros, in a single pass.
- RCMP TSSIT OPS-II - Royal Canadian Mounted Police Technical Security Standard, OPS-II
- DoD 5220.22M - The United States Department of Defense 5220.22-M full 7 pass wipe.
- Gutmann method - Peter Gutmann's method for the Secure Deletion of Data from Magnetic and Solid-State Memory.
- PRNG Stream - Fills the device with a stream from the PRNG.
- Verify only - Only reads the device and checks that it is all zero.
- HMG IS5 enhanced - Secure Sanitation of Protectively Marked Information or Sensitive Information

It uses two types of pseudo random number generators:

- Mersenne Twister
- ISAAC

== Employment ==
nwipe has also been incorporated in free software rescue toolkit packages, such as the All in One - System Rescue Toolkit, Parted Magic, ShredOS and SystemRescue.
