= MiniTool Partition Wizard =

Partition manager for Windows

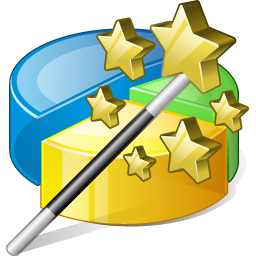
- Developer: MiniTool Software Limited
- Release: 24 July 2009; 16 years ago
- Stable release: 13.9 / 7 July 2026; 13 days ago
- Operating system: Microsoft Windows
- Available in: English, German, Japanese, French, Spanish, Portuguese, Italian, Korean
- Type: Utility software
- License: Freeware/trialware available up to version 11
- Website: https://www.partitionwizard.com/

MiniTool Partition Wizard is a partition management program for hard disk drives developed by MiniTool Software Ltd.

The 'free' version cannot save any of the data that the software may find.

From version 12, some free features have been removed, including resizing capabilities.

== Timeline ==
Date	Version	Main Updates
July 22, 2009	V4.0	Initial Release
April 13, 2010	V5.0	Extend NTFS partition without reboot. Support Linux Ext2, Ext3 system. New GUI.
May 9, 2011	V6.0	Support Linux Ext4 file system. Support 2 TB partition for FAT32. Performance optimization. New GUI.
September 5, 2011	V7.0	Support Windows Dynamic Disk.
July 1, 2013	V8.0	Support to copy dynamic disk volume. Support to convert NTFS to FAT. Support conversion between GPT Disk and MBR Disk.
January 14, 2015	V9.0	Supports Storage Spaces in Windows 8. Bug fixes.
February 15, 2017	V10.0	Copy MBR disk to GPT disk, including system disk. Convert system disk from MBR to GPT. Create, format, delete, copy, label, wipe exFAT partition and more. View GPT disk partition properties, including Partition Type ID and Partition ID. Change Partition Type ID on GPT disk. Brand new Boot Media Builder based on WinPE. Support HD resolution (4K,5K).
January 23, 2019	V11.0	Add Data Recovery feature. Add Disk Benchmark feature. Add Space Analyzer feature. Bug fixes.
April 1, 2020	V12.0	New GUI. Improved data recovery quality of pictures and videos. Bug fixes.
September 16, 2025	V13.0	Enhanced UI clarity on high-DPI displays to ensure sharp and readable text. Optimized the Data Recovery feature in several aspects.
July 19, 2026	V13.9	Added BitLocker Manager for full control of BitLocker encryption. Enhanced BitLocker support for partitioning, including move, resize, split, and copy, with safer handling logic. Supports up to 2 MB cluster size for partition creation, formatting, and cluster adjustment. Optimized NTFS partition resizing to reduce the risk of system boot issues after shrinking system drives. Improved disk copy stability to ensure all partitions are correctly included during the cloning process. Standardized disk numbering to match the Windows system disk index starting from 0. Improved UI experience with better clarity, scaling, and overall visual consistency. Fixed an issue where the software could crash due to WebView2 errors on Windows 11 with Administrator Protection enabled.

== See also ==
- Disk partitioning
- List of disk partitioning software
