= PartitionMagic =

Utility software program

- Main window of PartitionMagic 8.05
- Final release: 8.05 (Build 1371) / May 5, 2004; 22 years ago
- Operating system: DOS, Microsoft Windows
- Type: Partition editor
- License: Trialware

PartitionMagic is a utility software program for hard disk drive partitioning originally made by PowerQuest, but subsequently owned by Symantec. As of December 8, 2009, the Symantec website stated that they no longer offer PartitionMagic.

The program runs on pre-Vista Microsoft Windows operating systems including Windows 2000 and Windows XP, but the application is incompatible with Windows Vista and later versions (although Microsoft added resizing). In any of these cases, existing partitions can be resized without loss of data.

== Details ==
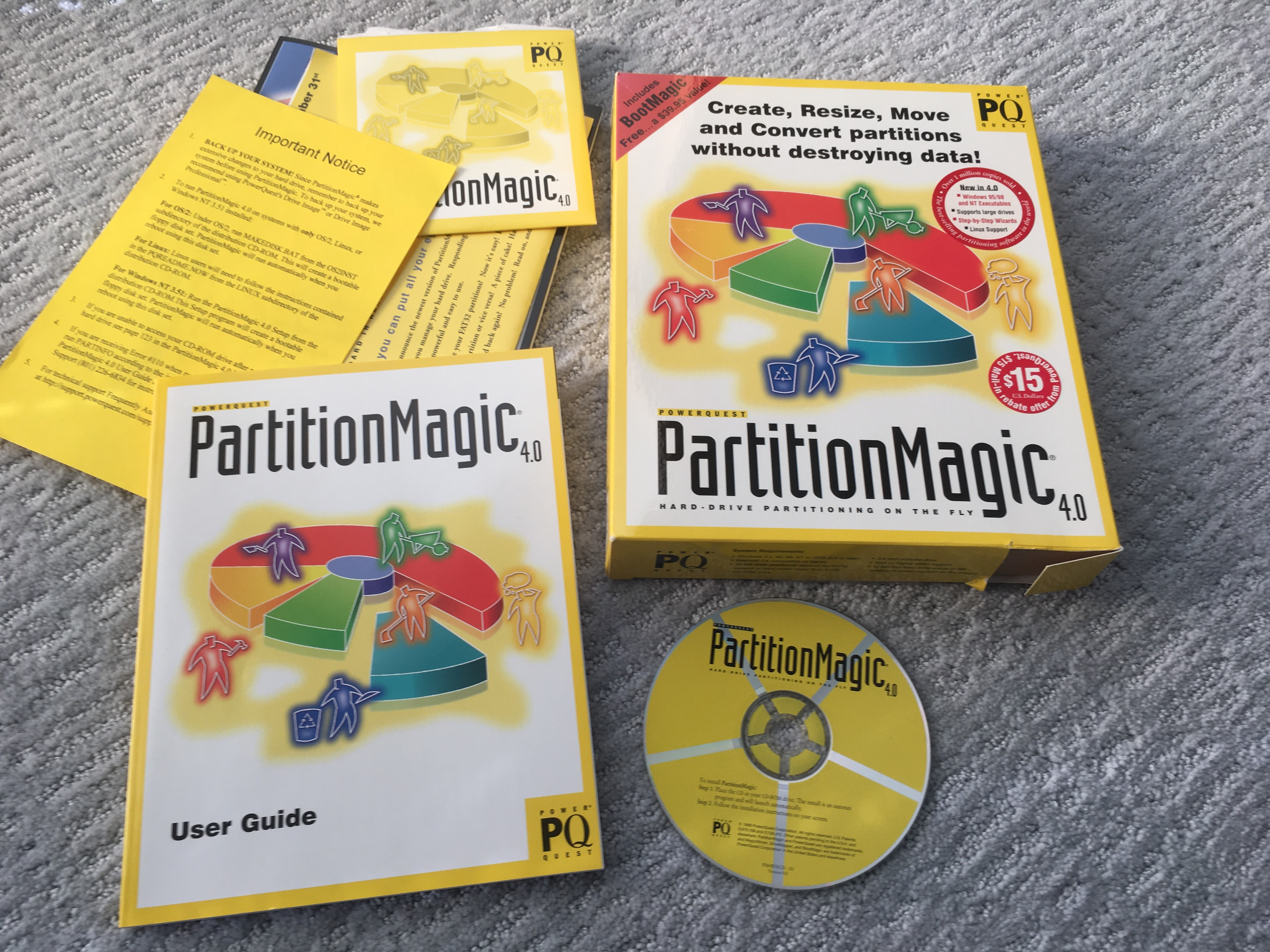
PartitionMagic 4.0 product materials, c. 1998

PartitionMagic is capable of resizing NTFS, FAT16 or FAT32 partitions without data loss, and can copy and move partitions, including to other disks. It also has various other features, including being able to convert between FAT16, FAT32 and NTFS, modify the cluster size of FAT16, FAT32 and NTFS filesystems, and merge adjacent FAT or NTFS filesystems (all without data loss, though some NTFS-only metadata is lost on conversion to FAT). Additionally, it had somewhat limited support for ext2 and ext3 partitions. PartitionMagic was the first commercial product of its kind containing patented technology.

The first version of PartitionMagic was released with DOS and OS/2 support. Versions 2–3 were offered with DOS, OS/2 and Windows support. Symantec's PartitionMagic version 8 dropped the OS/2 version. Server versions were also offered under the name Server Magic for Windows and Novell NetWare servers.

The stable version of PartitionMagic 8.05 also included a rescue floppy disk with an additional DOS version of PartitionMagic. The DOS version (which included DR-DOS or MS-DOS) came on one 2.88 MB or two 1.44 MB floppy disks.

The Windows version of PartitionMagic could also be integrated in BartPE (Bart's Preinstalled Environment) a Windows XP based Live CD created by using the PE Builder. To integrate PartitionMagic into BartPE a PE Builder plug-in for PartitionMagic was available.

== History ==
PowerQuest's Partition Magic originated in 1993; Version 2.0 was available for purchase by January 1995. An OS/2 version was available by September 1995.

Version 3.02 came out in early 1997.

PartitionMagic, while under PowerQuest, was updated regularly, adding new features.

Once Symantec purchased the application in 2003, there were no new releases, and Symantec stated that it had no plans on releasing a new version. As of October 13, 2011, the Symantec website stated, "Sorry, we no longer offer Norton Partition Magic."

== Compatibility issues ==
PartitionMagic is compatible with Windows NT, 95/98, ME, 2000, and XP desktop editions. However, it is not compatible with server editions of Windows NT, 2000, nor 2003 by design – a more expensive product from the same manufacturer, ServerMagic, would handle these – nor does it run on Windows Vista and later versions.

PartitionMagic 2.0.5, VolumeManager 7 and VolumeManager 8 cannot resize dynamic disks.

== See also ==
- Disk partitioning
- List of disk partitioning software
- ntfsresize
- resize2fs
