= Workrave =

Repetitive strain injury software

- Release: 2002; 24 years ago
- Written in: C++ (Gtkmm)
- Operating system: Linux, Cross-platform
- Type: Health-related software Repetitive strain injury
- License: GNU General Public License
- Website: workrave.org
- Repository: github.com/rcaelers/workrave

Workrave is a free software application intended to prevent computer users from developing or aggravating occupational diseases such as carpal tunnel syndrome, repetitive strain injuries, or myopia.

The software encourages taking breaks and periodically locks the screen while showing an animated character, “Miss Workrave”, walks the user through various stretching exercises, urges them to take a coffee break and sets a daily work time limit after which it automatically triggers an action, such as suspend the machine.

The program is cross-platform and dependent on the GTK+ graphical widget toolkit as well as other GNOME libraries on Linux such as GNet . It is also available for Microsoft Windows.

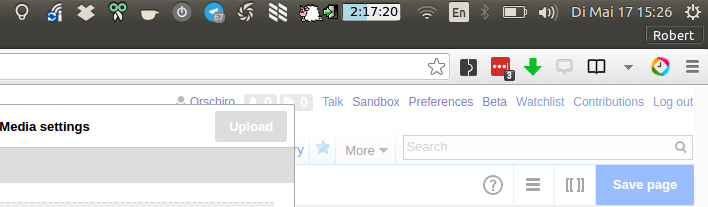
Workrave Unity Integration on Ubuntu 16.04

== See also ==
- List of repetitive strain injury software
- Repetitive strain injury
