= E2fsprogs =

Software to maintain ext* file systems

e2fsprogs
- Developer: Theodore Ts'o
- Stable release: 1.47.4 / 6 March 2026; 3 months ago
- Written in: C
- Operating system: Linux, Unix-like
- Type: File system utilities
- License: GPL
- Website: e2fsprogs.sourceforge.net
- Repository: git.kernel.org/pub/scm/fs/ext2/e2fsprogs.git

e2fsprogs (sometimes called the e2fs programs) is a set of utilities for maintaining the ext2, ext3 and ext4 file systems for the Linux kernel. Since those file systems are often the default for Linux distributions, it is commonly considered to be essential software.

== List of utilities ==
Included with e2fsprogs, ordered by ASCIIbetical order, are:

badblocks
search a device for bad blocks
blkid
locate/print block device attributes
chattr
change file attributes on a Linux file system
debugfs
used to manually view or modify internal structures of the file system
dumpe2fs
prints superblock and block group information.
e2freefrag
report free space fragmentation information
e2fsck
an fsck program that checks for and corrects inconsistencies
e2image
save critical ext2/ext3/ext4 filesystem metadata to a file
e2label
change the label on an ext2/ext3/ext4 filesystem
e2scrub
check a filesystem "online" (i.e. without having to unmount it) in the case where the filesystem is on an LVM LV
e2undo
replay an undo log for an ext2/ext3/ext4 filesystem
e4defrag
online defragmenter for ext4 filesystems
filefrag
report file fragmentation
findfs
find a filesystem by label or UUID
findsuper
quick hacked up program to find ext2 superblocks
logsave
save the output of a command in a logfile
lsattr
list file attributes on a Linux second extended file system
mke2fs
used for creating ext2, ext3 and ext4 file systems
resize2fs
which can expand and shrink ext2, ext3 and ext4 file systems. On-line support was added in 2006.
tune2fs
used to modify file system parameters

Many of these utilities are based on the libext2fs library.

== Usage ==
Despite what its name might suggest, e2fsprogs works not only with ext2, but also with ext3 and ext4. Although ext3's journaling capability can reduce the need to use e2fsck, it is sometimes still necessary to help protect against kernel bugs or bad hardware.

As the userspace companion for the ext2, ext3, and ext4 drivers in the Linux kernel, the e2fsprogs are most commonly used with Linux. However, they have been ported to other systems, such as FreeBSD and Darwin.

== See also ==
- mkfs
- dd — convert and copy a file
- fdisk — examine and write partition table
- fsck — file system check
- mkisofs — make an iso file system
- mount — mount a file system
- parted — partition manager
