= Disk Copy =

Utility in Mac OS

- Developer: Apple Computer
- Stable release: 10.2
- Operating system: System Software 6, System 7, Mac OS 8, Mac OS 9, Mac OS X v10.0, Mac OS X v10.1, Mac OS X v10.2
- Type: disk image emulator

Disk Copy was the default utility for handling logical volume images in System 7 through Mac OS X 10.2 (usable in System Software 6 as well). In later versions of macOS it has been replaced by DiskImageMounter for mounting the images and Disk Utility for creating them.

== File format support ==
"Disk Copy 4.2" (DC42) is the common name used to refer to disk images of floppy disks created by the 4.2 version of Disk Copy. DART is a variant that supports compression, and was initially handled by the DART (Disk Archive/Retrieval Tool) utility.

Disk Copy 6.0 added support for the New Disk Image Format (NDIF). Versions of Disk Copy in Mac OS X added support for the newer Universal Disk Format (UDIF) image format, introduced with DMG files in Mac OS X.

Although the last official public release of Disk Copy for Mac OS 9 was version 6.3.3, there was to be a version 6.5 that supported OS X's UDIF image format. But because Apple had stopped support for OS 9 already, support for the old OS was eventually removed in favor of Mac OS X. As such the OS 9 version of 6.5 only ever made it to beta 13 before development on it stopped. There was also a developer version 6.4 that 6.5 was based on and had most of the same functionality, but as a developer version it was never released. Although version 6.4 and 6.5 will read DMG images when the system is booted into OS 9, they can only do so if the image is not compressed.

Other image formats supported by Disk Copy include DiskSet and raw disk images.

== Original Disk Copy utility ==
Disk Copy was also the name of an Apple utility distributed with some of the earliest versions of the classic Mac OS. In order to copy 400K floppy disks using as few disk swaps as possible on a machine with only 128K of RAM, the original Disk Copy used the screen buffer to store binary data from the disk being copied; as a result, the screen (other than a small area at the bottom displaying the GUI) filled with noise while copying was in progress. It was shipped with System 1.1 and System 2.0.

== See also ==
- dd (Unix)
- Dcfldd
- DiskImageMounter — The Mac OS X 10.3 and later successor.
- Disk Utility — Creates disk images in Mac OS X 10.3 and later.
- RaWrite and RaWrite2 for MS-DOS and Microsoft Windows
