= Diskpart =

Command line program

diskpart
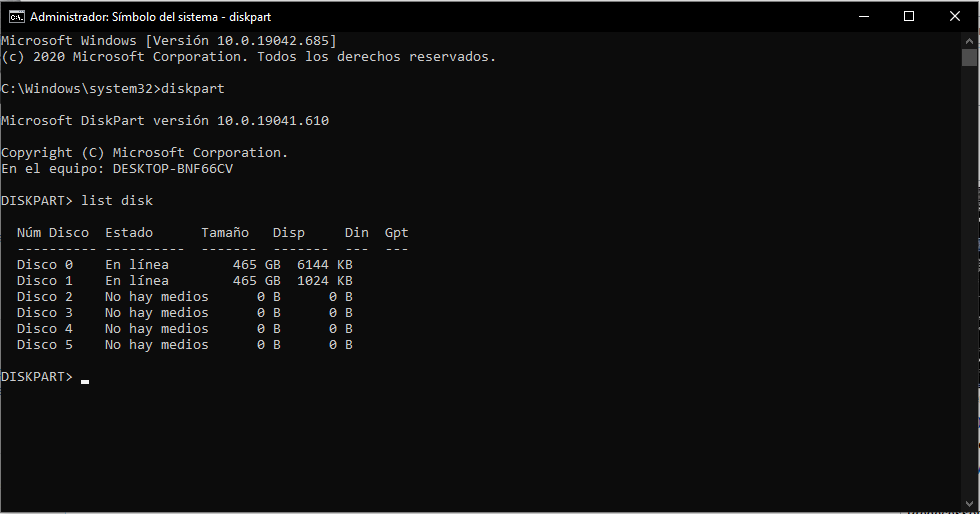
- Screenshot of diskpart in Windows 10
- Developers: Microsoft, Lee Schroeder
- Operating system: Windows, ReactOS
- Platform: Cross-platform
- Predecessor: fdisk
- Type: Command
- License: Windows: Proprietary commercial software ReactOS: GPLv2
- Website: learn.microsoft.com/en-us/windows-server/administration/windows-commands/diskpart

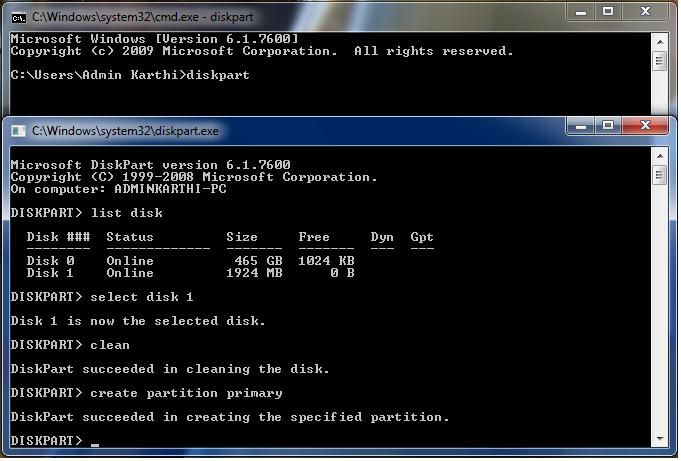
The Windows 7 diskpart command

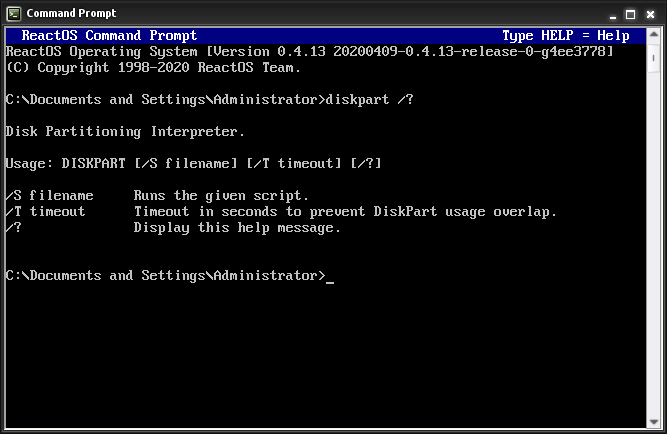
The ReactOS diskpart command

In computing, diskpart is a command-line disk partitioning utility included in Windows XP and later Microsoft operating systems, replacing its predecessor, fdisk. The command is also available in ReactOS.

== Overview ==
The diskpart utility is used for partitioning internal hard drives but can also format removable media such as flash drives.

It has long been possible, theoretically, to partition removable drives – such as flash drives or memory cards – from within Windows NT 4.0 / 2000 / XP; e.g., during system installation. In reality, however, it was not possible to create, for instance, a recovery console, for such a device. A message would appear: 'Cannot format removable disk'. Microsoft noticed this error and responded by disabling the functionalities of creating and viewing partitions on the device from within Windows, beginning with Vista up to Windows 10.

With diskpart, scripts are supported to facilitate such functions. For example, the code below would create a new partition:

create partition logical size=2048
assign letter=F

Specifically, the above will create a 2 GB logical partition, provided that adequate space is available, and assign it the drive letter 'F:'.

The installed disks and their associated volumes and/or partitions can be viewed using these commands:

list disk
list volume
list partition

The sel command will select them. The command clean will perform a "quick" disk wipe, and clean all zeroes out the entire partition/disk. The ReactOS version was developed by Lee Schroeder and is licensed under the GPLv2.

== Recovery Console ==
On the Recovery Console, which is included in all Windows 2000, Windows XP and Windows Server 2003, there is a diskpart command which is significantly different from the one included in the actual operating system. It only provides functionality for adding and deleting partitions, but not for setting an active partition.

== See also ==
- Logical Disk Manager
- Disk Utility
- parted, cfdisk
- List of disk partitioning software
- Windows Imaging Format
- Loop devices
- PartitionMagic
