= Ultimate Boot CD =

- Developer: Victor Chew
- License: freeware
- Official website: www.ultimatebootcd.com

The Ultimate Boot CD (UBCD) is a bootable CD-ROM containing a collection of diagnostic tools including CPU tests, memory tests, virus scanning, and other tools.

The Ultimate Boot CD (UBCD) contains over 100 system diagnostics and hardware troubleshooting utilities.

The Ultimate Boot CD contains freeware and open-source diagnostic tools from a variety of sources. Many of these tools were originally designed to boot from a floppy disk drive. The Ultimate Boot CD made it possible to run them on a PC without a floppy drive. UBCD can also run from USB for computers without an optical drive.

The UBCD website has relatively good documentation for using the UBCD, and a discussion forum.

The Ultimate Boot CD also includes tools to create customized USCD ISO images that can run additional tools extracted from bootable physical floppy disks and stored on the CD as floppy images (".img" or ".img.gz" files).

== Related projects ==
UBCD includes a variety of diagnostic tools that were originally intended to run under DOS, and also includes FreeDOS, which is used to run them.

UBCD includes a variety of disk partitioning, disk cloning, and antivirus utilities that were originally intended to run under Linux, and also includes a small Live CD Linux distribution (as of 2022, the freeware version of Parted Magic), which is used to run them.

The "Ultimate Windows Boot CD with ReactOS" is based on UBCD and ReactOS.

== See also ==
- List of live CDs § Rescue and repair
- List of bootable data recovery software
