= GNOME Disks =

GNOME disk utility

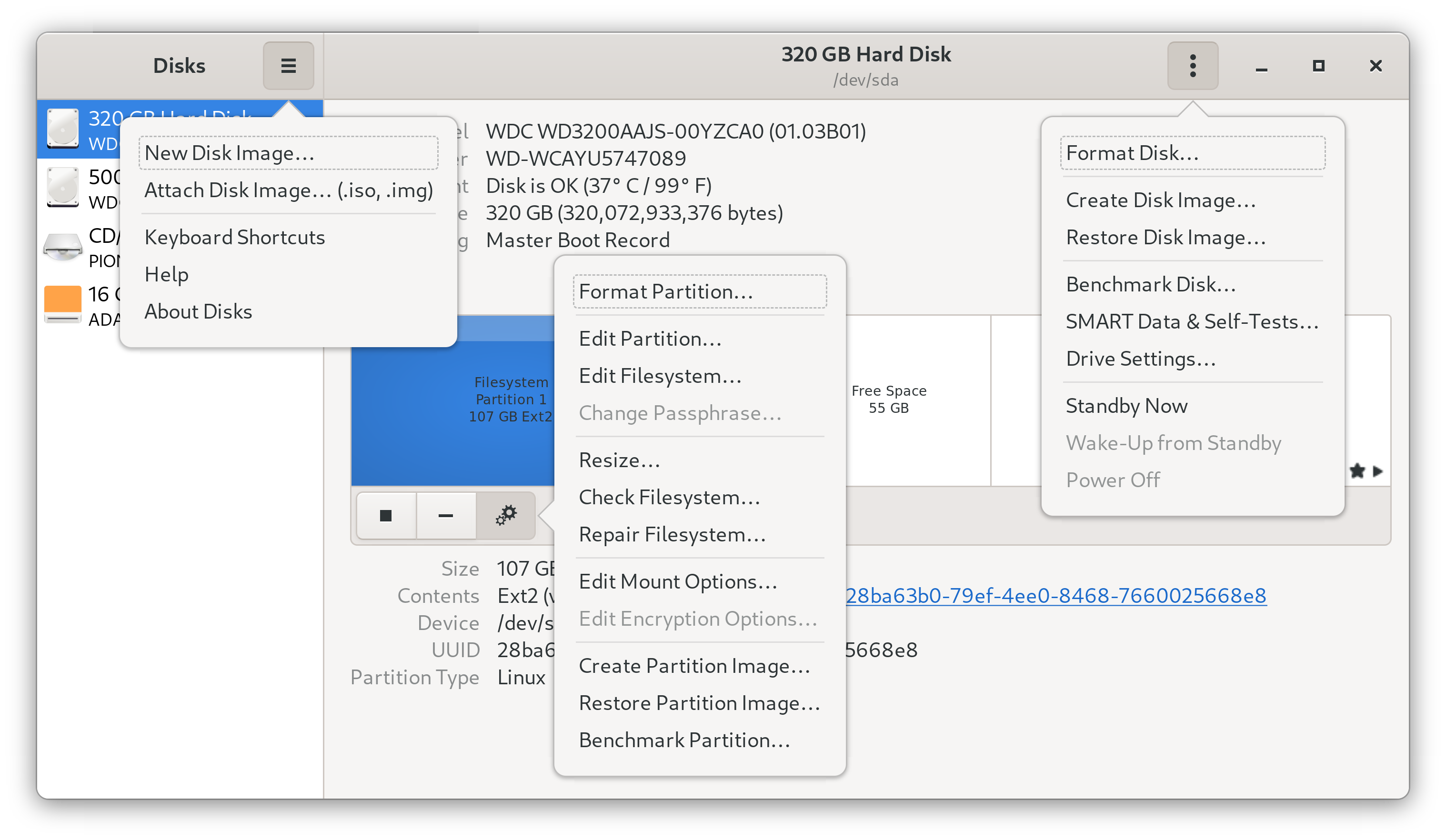
- GNOME Disks 40 (released in March 2021)
- Original author: Red Hat
- Developer: David Zeuthen
- Stable release: 46.1 / 3 September 2024; 23 months ago
- Written in: C
- Operating system: Linux
- Platform: GNOME
- Size: 1.4 MB
- Available in: Multilingual
- Type: Partition editor
- License: GPL-2.0-or-later
- Website: apps.gnome.org/en/app/org.gnome.DiskUtility/
- Repository: gitlab.gnome.org/GNOME/gnome-disk-utility.git

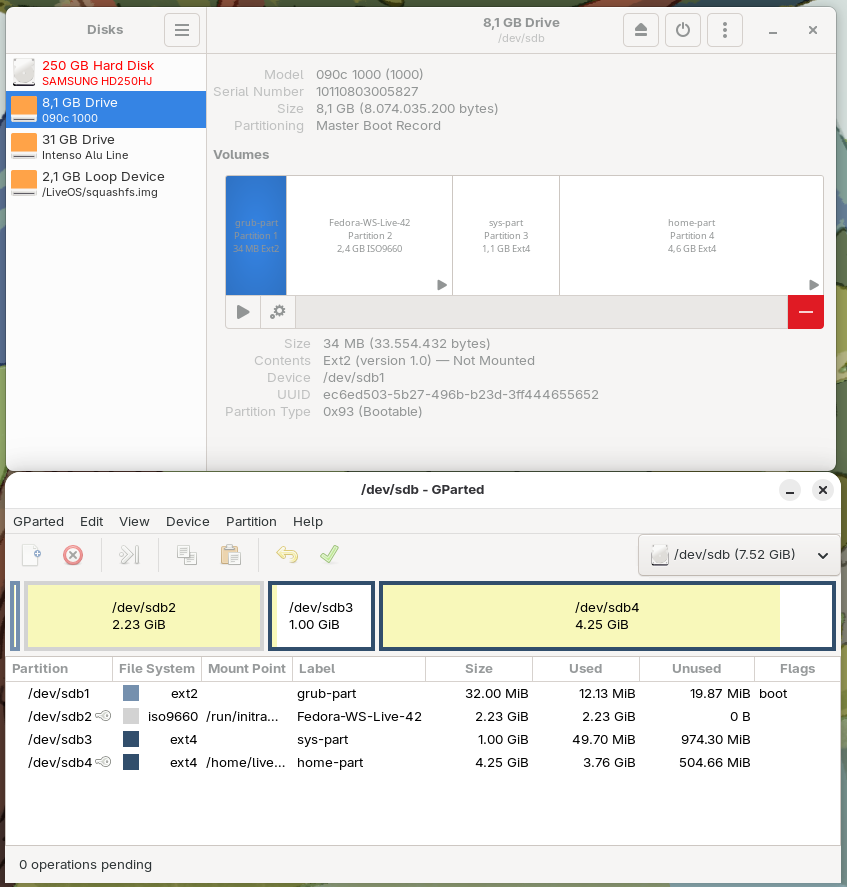
Screenshot of GParted and gnome-disks showing the same disk

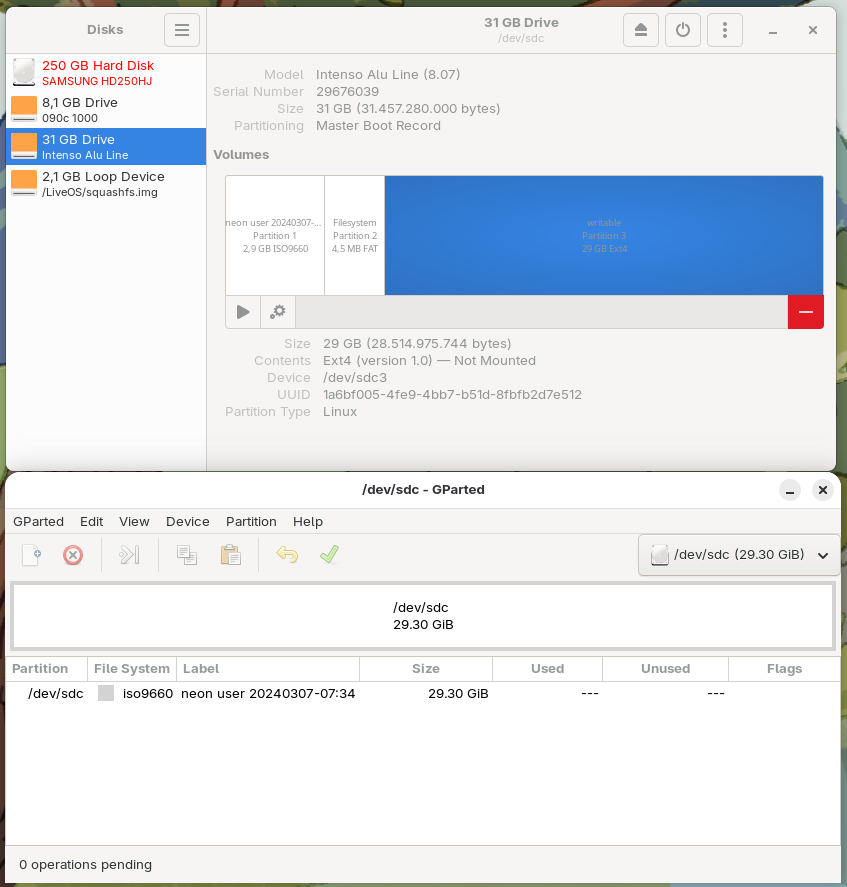
Screenshot of GParted and gnome-disks showing the same disk

GNOME Disks is a graphical front-end for udisks. It can be used for partition management, S.M.A.R.T. monitoring, benchmarking, and software RAID (until v. 3.12). An introduction is included in the GNOME Documentation Project.

Disks used to be known as GNOME Disk Utility or palimpsest Disk Utility. Udisks was named DeviceKit-disks in earlier releases. DeviceKit-disks is part of DeviceKit which was planned to replace certain aspects of HAL. HAL and DeviceKit have been deprecated.

GNOME Disks has been included by default in several Linux distributions including Debian, Ubuntu, Linux Mint, Trisquel, Fedora, Red Hat Enterprise Linux and CentOS.

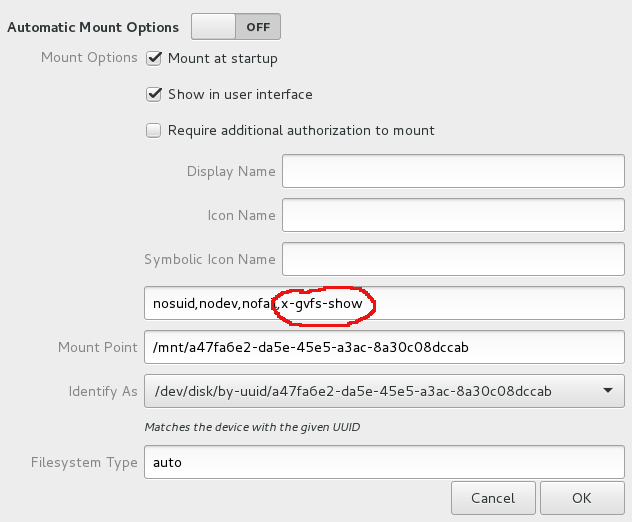
GNOME Disks acts as a front-end to udisks2 and gvfs-udisks2-volume-monitor.

== See also ==
- List of disk partitioning software
- System monitor
- Comparison of S.M.A.R.T. tools
- GParted – another alternative
- KDE Partition Manager - KDE program
- Disk utility
