= Cfdisk =

Linux partition editor

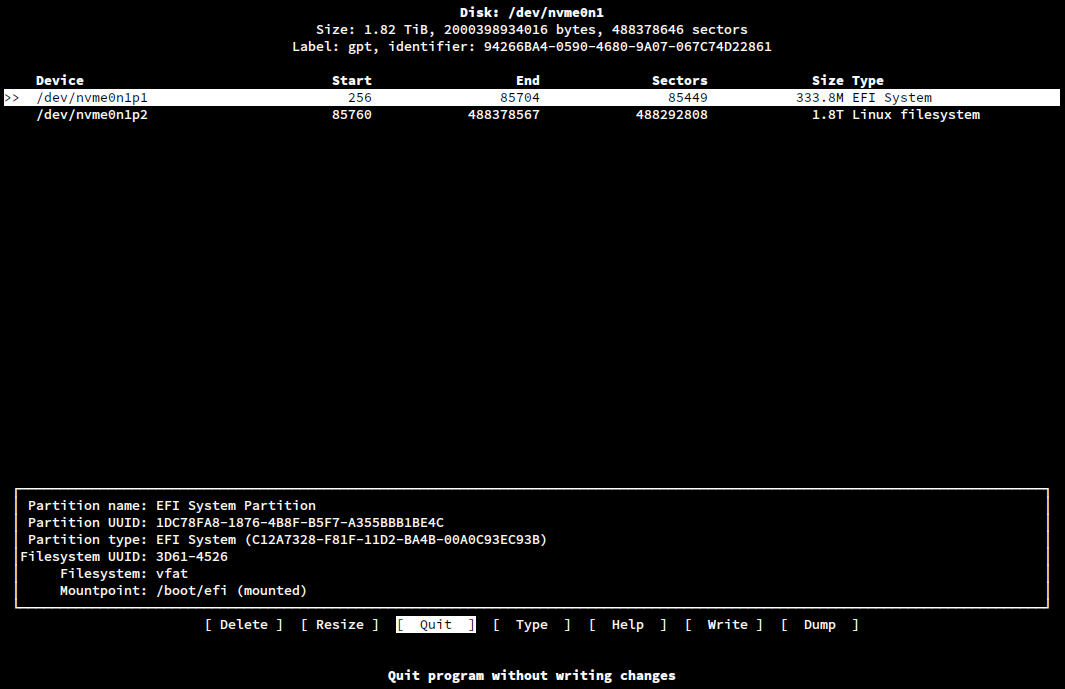
A screenshot of cfdisk's user interface.

cfdisk is a Linux partition editor, similar to fdisk, but with a different, curses-based user interface. It is part of the util-linux package of Linux utility programs.

The current cfdisk implementation utilizes the libfdisk library and supports partitioning of disks that use Master boot record, GUID Partition Table, BSD disklabel, SGI or SUN disk labels. It also provides information about mount points and general partition information like partition names, types/flags, sizing and UUIDs.

If invoked without arguments, cfdisk attempts to read the current partition table from the disk drive and present its findings.

== See also ==
- format
- gpart
- parted, GParted
- diskpart
- List of disk partitioning software
