= GNU Parted =

Open-source partition editor

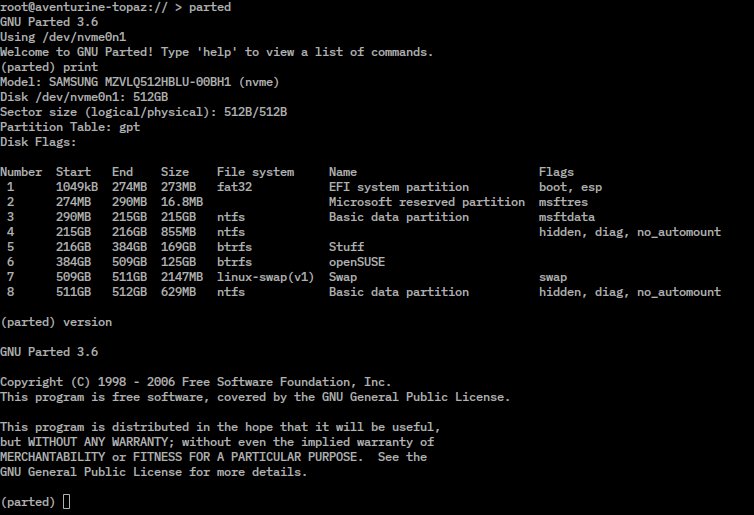
- The parted command and example of disk partition information
- Original authors: Andrew Clausen, Lennert Buytenhek
- Developer: Various
- Stable release: 3.7 / 8 April 2026
- Written in: C
- Operating system: Linux, GNU Hurd
- Type: Partition editor
- License: GPL-3.0-or-later
- Website: www.gnu.org/software/parted/
- Repository: GNU Parted Repository

GNU Parted (from GNU partition editor) is a free partition editor, used for creating and deleting partitions. This is useful for creating space for new operating systems, reorganising hard disk usage, copying data between hard disks, and disk imaging. It was written by Andrew Clausen and Lennert Buytenhek.

It consists of a library, libparted, and a command-line front-end, parted, that also serves as a reference implementation.

Currently, GNU Parted runs only under Linux and GNU Hurd.

== Other front-ends ==
=== Text-based ===
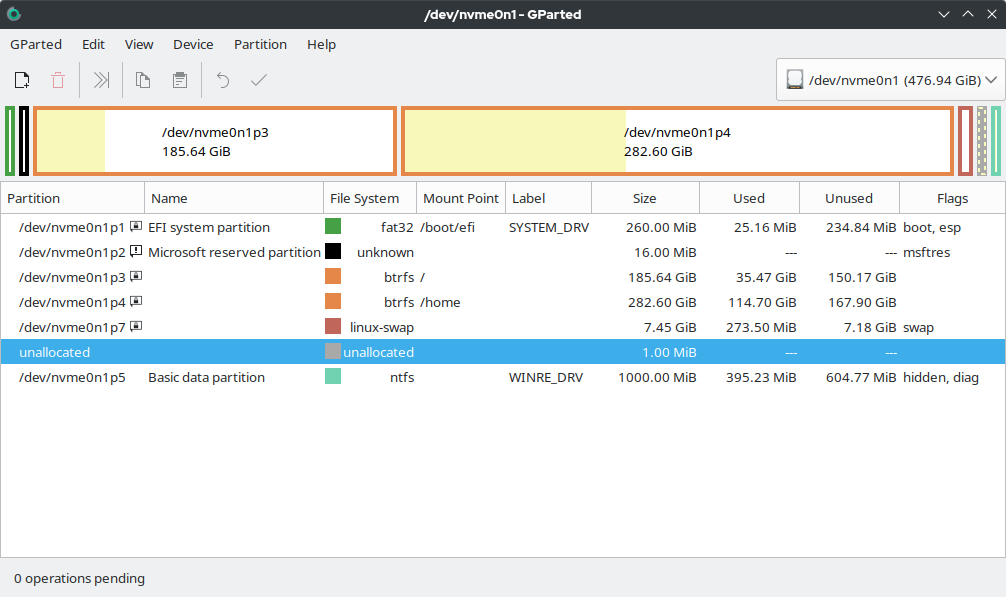
GParted uses GNU Parted in the backend

nparted is the newt-based frontend to GNU Parted.

Projects have started for an ncurses frontend, that also could be used in Windows (with GNUWin32 Ncurses).

fatresize offers a command-line interface for FAT16/FAT32 non-destructive resize and uses the GNU Parted library.

tparted is the TV/FV-based frontend for GNU Parted.

=== Graphical front-ends ===
GParted is a graphical program using the parted libraries. It is adapted for GNOME, one of the two major desktop environments (the other being KDE) for Unix-like installations. It is often included as utility on many live CD distributions to make partitioning easier.

KDE Partition Manager is a Qt graphical program, also included on many live CD distributions, which made use of parted libraries; in version 4.0 its backend KPMcore was ported away from libparted to sfdisk. QtParted was another graphical front-end based on Qt that is no longer being actively maintained.

Pyparted (also called python-parted) is the Python front-end for GNU Parted.

Linux distributions that come with parted by default include Slackware, Knoppix, sidux, SystemRescueCD, Parted Magic, and GParted Live.

== Limitations ==
Parted previously had support for operating on filesystems within partitions (creating, moving, resizing, copying). This support was removed in version 3.0.

== See also ==
- List of disk partitioning software
- util-linux:
  - fdisk
  - cfdisk
  - sfdisk
- gpart
- gparted
- FIPS
- Master Boot Record manager
