= Parted Magic =

Commercial Linux distribution

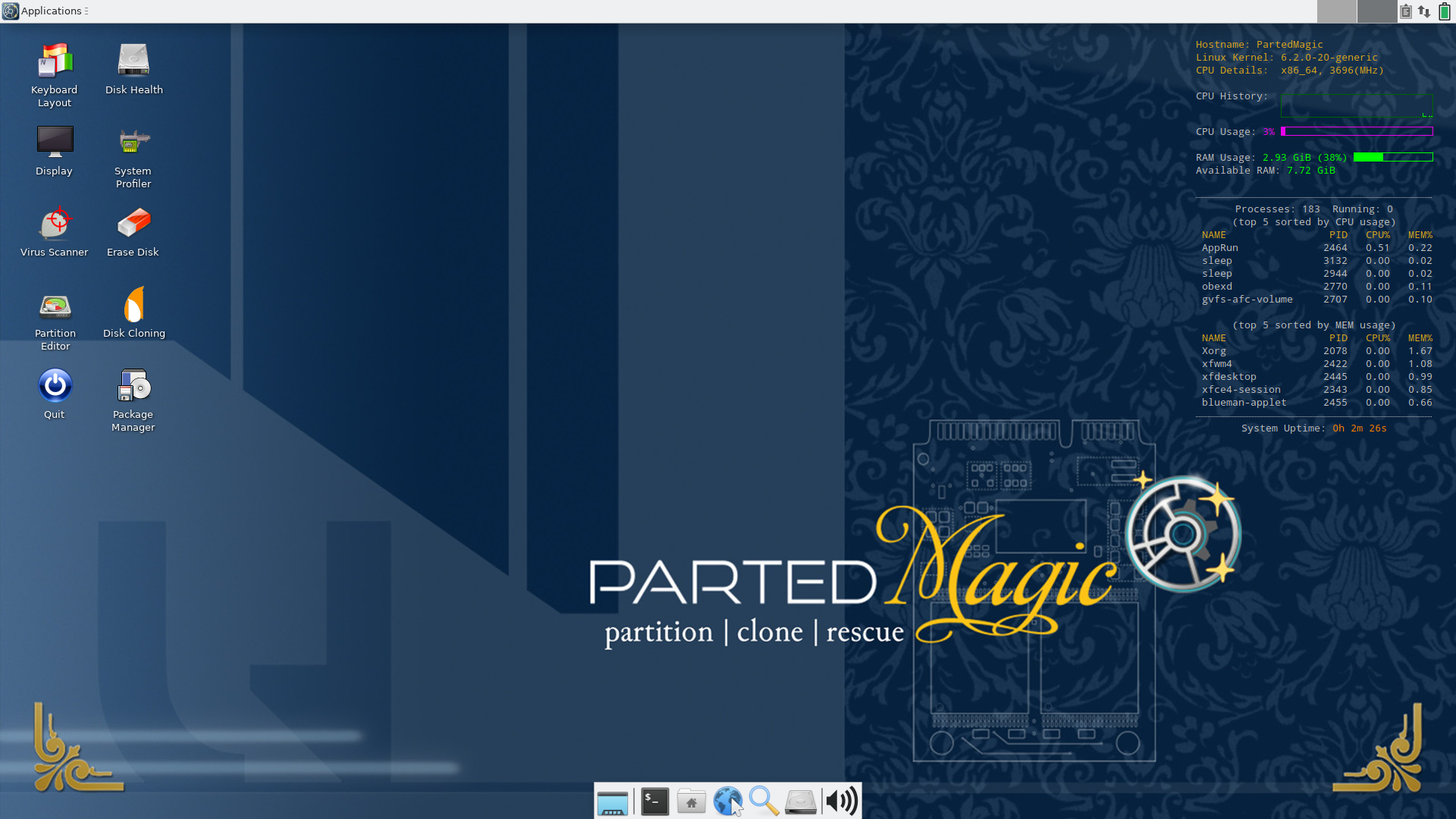
- Screenshot of Parted Magic in 2023
- Developer: Patrick Verner; Parted Magic LLC.
- OS family: Linux (Unix-like)
- Working state: Current
- Initial release: 8 January 2007 (19 years ago)
- Latest release: 26.09 / 18 October 2016; 10 years ago
- Available in: English
- Supported platforms: x86-64 (IA-32 previously supported)
- Kernel type: Linux (Monolithic)
- Default user interface: Xfce (previously Openbox)
- Official website: partedmagic.com

Parted Magic is a commercial Linux distribution based on Slackware that comes with disk partitioning and data recovery tools. It is sold as a Linux-based bootable disk. The distribution's nomenclature is derived from the names of the GNU Parted and PartitionMagic software packages.

== Features ==
The program is directly bootable from a CD, USB flash drive, or through a network using PXE on PC hardware, and does not require installation, or the presence of an installed operating system.

Although originally designed for mechanical hard disk drives, Parted Magic is suitable for use also with solid state drives and can perform an ATA Secure Erase (a method that is built into the hard drive controller to return the drive to its factory state).

Parted Magic supports reading and writing to a variety of modern file systems, including ext3, ext4, FAT, exFAT, and NTFS, and as such is able to access disk drives formatted for use under Microsoft Windows and Linux systems.

The software distribution includes networking support, and comes with the Firefox web browser.

== System requirements ==
As of version 11.11.11, Parted Magic supports x86-64 processors natively (32-bit x86 processors were previously supported), and requires a computer with at least a 64-bit Intel-compatible processor and 2GB of RAM. Secure Boot is also supported. x86 versions from 2013-09-26 do not require the Physical Address Extension (PAE) computer processor feature.

All versions starting from 2020_08_23 no longer support 32-bit x86 systems.

== Availability ==
Up to version 2013.08.01 the distribution was freely available for download from the official website and the project page on SourceForge. The distribution moved to a pay-for-download business model, despite the packaged software being free and open source.

== See also ==
- SystemRescue – completely libre and free-to-download Live CD/USB system rescue disc
- gparted – partition editor included with Parted Magic
- Disk partitioning
- List of disk partitioning software
