= Ntfsresize =

- Platform: Linux
- License: open source
- Website: www.linux-ntfs.org

ntfsresize is a free Unix utility that non-destructively resizes the NTFS filesystem used by Windows NT 4.0, 2000, XP, 2003, Vista, 7, 8, 10, and 11 typically on a hard-disk partition. All NTFS versions used by 32-bit and 64-bit Windows are supported. No defragmentation is required prior to resizing since version 1.11.2. ntfsresize is included in the ntfsprogs package, developed by the Linux-NTFS project. For those that don't have a Unix system installed, it is still possible to run ntfsresize by using one of the many Linux Live CDs.

== Development ==
ntfsresize is one of the utilities in the NTFS-3G project and is able to resize NTFS volumes. The upstream project is continuing to maintain and develop the utility; its source repository contains changes to ntfsresize and related NTFS utilities. In 2026, work on the following items was done: Fixes for and changes to documentation of ntfsresize.

== ntfsresize features ==
- Full compatibility with all known NTFS versions from Windows NT 3.1 to Windows Vista
- Checks internal structures for errors
- Will work in various difficult situations:
  - No defragmentation needed prior to use
  - Supports both shrinking and expanding NTFS
  - Supports resizing volumes with known bad sectors in them
- Will refuse to run under certain conditions:
  - When the volume is flagged dirty, that is marked for Windows to run CHKDSK at boot. The --force switch will override this
  - When Windows is hibernated on the partition

== See also ==
- ntfsprogs
