= KDE Partition Manager =

Open-source partition editor

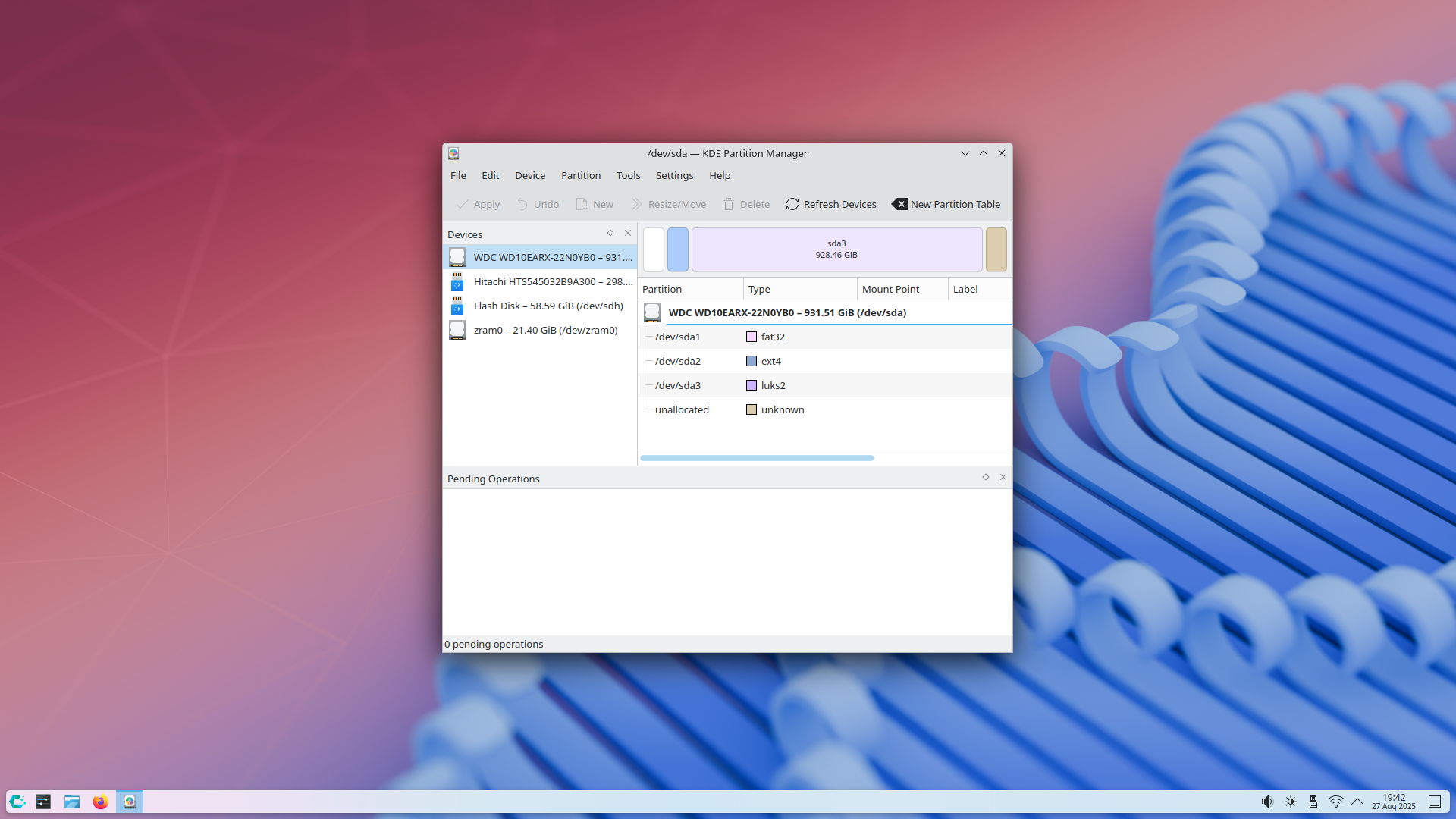
- Screenshot of KDE Partition Manager 25.08.0
- Original author: Volker Lanz
- Developers: Andrius Štikonas, Caio Jordão Carvalho
- Release: 1.0.0alpha1 (18 September 2008; 17 years ago)
- Stable release: 24.12.2 / 6 February 2025
- Written in: C++ (Qt)
- Type: Partition editor
- License: 2015 (Note: GPL-3.0-or-later since 2015-08-03, version 1.2.0.): GPL-3.0-or-later; 2008 (Note: GPL-2.0-or-later since 2008-09-18, from version 1.0.0alpha1 to 1.1.1): GPL-2.0-or-later
- Website: apps.kde.org/partitionmanager/
- Repository: invent.kde.org/system/partitionmanager

KDE Partition Manager is a disk partitioning application originally written by Volker Lanz for the KDE Platform. It was first released for KDE SC 4.1 and is released independently of the central KDE release cycle. After the death of Volker Lanz in April 2014, Andrius Štikonas continued the development and took over as the maintainer.

It is used for creating, deleting, resizing, moving, checking and copying partitions, and the file systems on them. This is useful for creating space for new operating systems, reorganizing disk usage, copying data residing on hard disks and mirroring one partition with another (disk imaging). Additionally, KDE Partition Manager can back up file systems to files and restore such backups.

It uses util-linux to detect and manipulate devices and partition tables while several (optional) file system tools provide support for manipulating file systems. These optional packages will be detected at runtime and do not require a rebuild of KDE Partition Manager.

As is the case with most KDE applications, KDE Partition Manager is written in the C++ programming language and uses the Qt GUI toolkit. Released under the GNU General Public License, KDE Partition Manager is free software.

== Dependencies ==
partitionmanager depends on

- kpmcore
- KF6::ConfigCore
- KF6::ConfigGui
- KF6::ConfigWidgets
- KF6::CoreAddons
- KF6::Crash
- KF6::DBusAddons
- KF6::I18n
- KF6::JobWidgets
- KF6::KIOWidgets
- KF6::WidgetsAddons
- KF6::XmlGui
- KF6::WindowSystem
- PolkitQt6-1::Core

== Release history ==
KDE Partition Manager is part of KDE Gear. KDE Gear and KDE Plasma rely on KDE Frameworks. According to the release cycle, there should be 3 releases per year. The software versioning changed after version 4.2.

Colour	Meaning
Red	Release no longer supported
Green	Release still supported
Blue	Future release

Major Version	Minor Version	Release date	Notes
1.0	1.0.0alpha1	18 September 2008	Initial release.
1.0	1.0.0alpha2	24 September 2008	Important bugs fixed.
1.0	1.0.0beta1a	13 January 2009	Crashes and bugs fixed, ext4 support.
1.0	1.0.0beta2	30 April 2009	Bugs fixed. Introduces the KCModule.
1.0	1.0.0beta3	4 June 2009	Bugs fixed. Speed and usability improvements.
1.0	1.0.0rc1	3 August 2009	Bugs fixed.
1.0	1.0.0	18 August 2009	First stable
1.0	1.0.1	9 January 2010	Bugs fixed.
1.0	1.0.2	24 April 2010	Bugs fixed. Usability improvement.
1.0	1.0.3	1 September 2010	Bugs fixed. Usability improvements.
1.1	1.1.0	10 July 2014	New features, support for 4096 byte sectors, Btrfs, GPT, exFAT, NILFS 2, and more. First release by Andrius Štikonas.
1.1	1.1.1	15 February 2015	Bugs fixed.
1.2	1.2.0	15 February 2015	New features. Ported to KDE Frameworks 5. Switched license to GPL-3.0-or-later.
1.2	1.2.1	17 February 2015	Bug fixed.
2.0	2.0.0	15 January 2016	Splitting user interface and partitioning library. Bugs fixed.
2.0	2.0.3	24 February 2016	Bugs fixed.
2.1	2.1.0	11 March 2016	Minimal support for F2FS.
2.2	2.2.1	27 May 2016	Support for LUKS.
3.0	3.0.0	18 December 2016	Support for LVM.
3.2	3.2.1	7 October 2017	UDF support.
3.3	3.3.1	14 December 2017	Better LVM and LUKS2 support.
4.0	4.0.0	01 May 2019	KPMcore backend was ported away from libparted to sfdisk (part of util-linux). Caio Jordão Carvalho ported S.M.A.R.T. code away from unmaintained libatasmart to smartmontools. Better support for LUKS2. Detection support for Apple's APFS filesystem and Microsoft's Bitlocker.
4.0	4.2.0	2020-10-13	
20.12	2020-12-02		
20.12.1	2021-01-02		
20.12.2	2021-01-22		
20.12.3	2021-02-25		
21.04	2021-??-??		
21.08	2021-??-??		
21.12	2021-??-??		
22.04	2022-??-??		
22.08	2022-??-??		
22.12	2022-??-??		
23.08.5	2024-02-15		
24.02.0	2024-02-28		
24.05.0	2024-05-23		
24.08.0	2024-08-22		
24.12.0	2024-12-12		
25.04.0	2025-04-17		
25.08.0	2025-08-14		
25.12.0	2025-12-11		

== See also ==
- Disk partitioning
- GNOME Disks - GNOME program
- List of disk partitioning software
