= GParted =

Partition editor

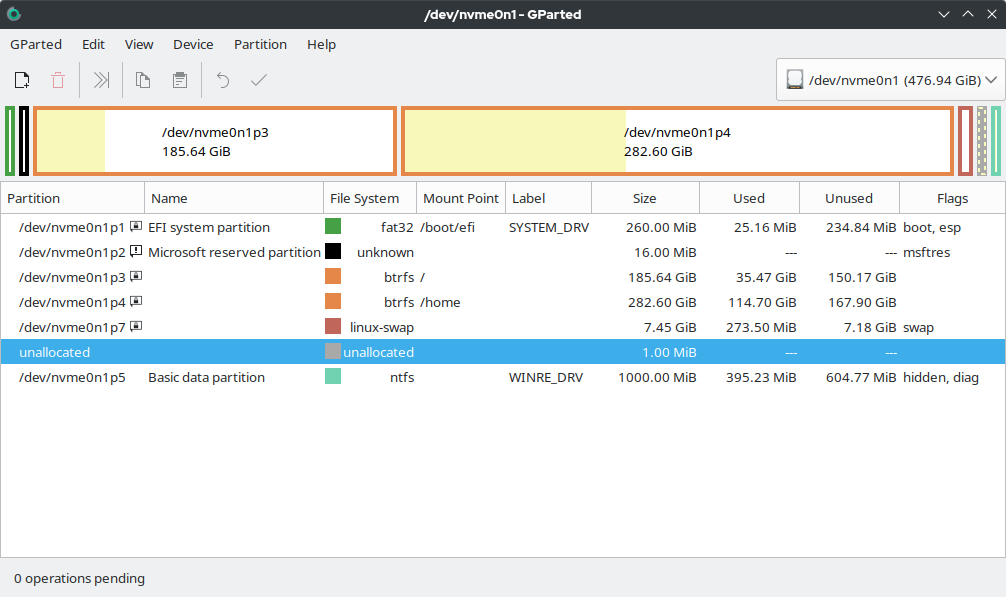
- GParted 1.3.1 showing a GPT-partitioned drive
- Developer: GParted developers
- Initial release: August 26, 2004; 21 years ago
- Stable release: 1.8.1 / 17 March 2026
- Written in: C++ (gtkmm)
- Operating system: Linux
- Type: Partition editor
- License: GPL-2.0-or-later
- Website: gparted.org
- Repository: GParted Repository

GParted is a GTK front-end to GNU Parted and an official GNOME partition-editing application (alongside Disks). GParted is used for creating, deleting, resizing, moving, checking, and copying disk partitions and their file systems. This is useful for creating space for new operating systems, reorganizing disk usage, copying data residing on hard disks, and mirroring one partition with another (disk imaging). It can also be used to format a USB drive.

== Background ==
libparted and udisks2 treat disks differently
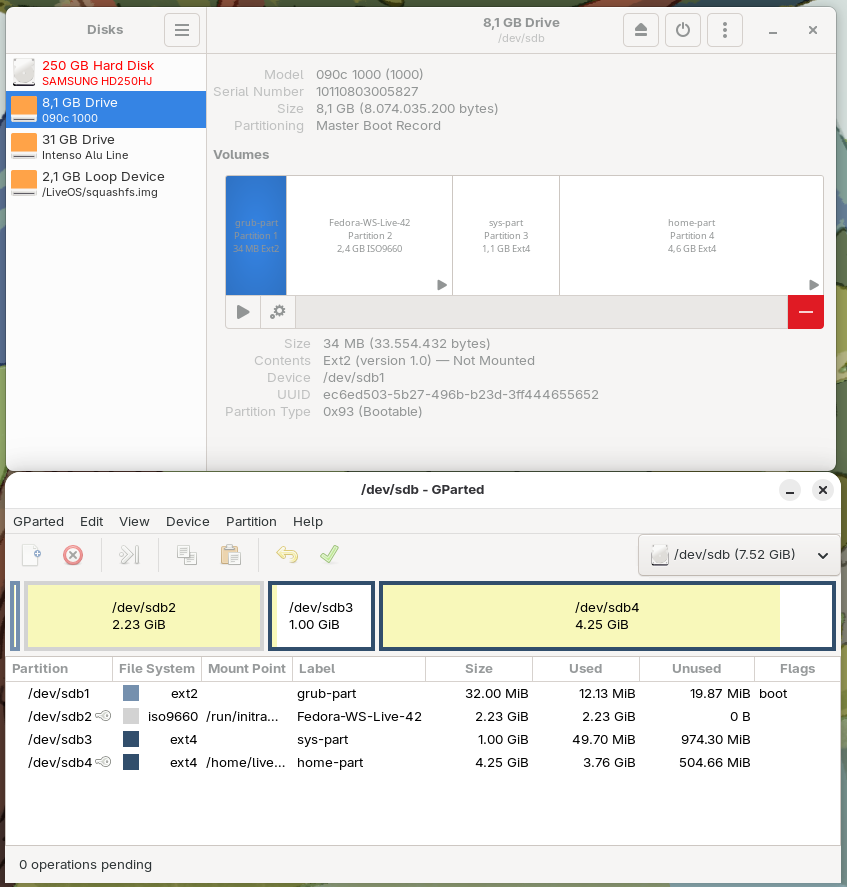
GParted and gnome-disks showing disk a

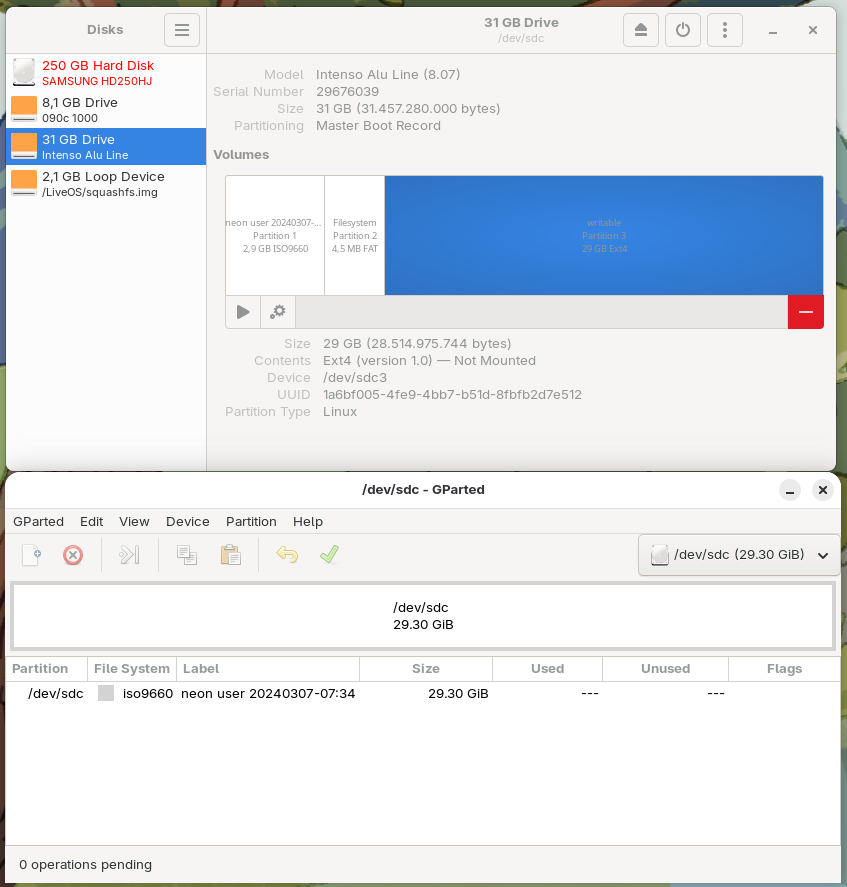
GParted and gnome-disks showing disk b

GParted uses libparted to detect and manipulate devices and partition tables while several (optional) file system tools provide support for file systems not included in libparted. These optional packages will be detected at runtime and do not require a rebuild of GParted. GParted supports the following filesystems: Ext2, Ext3, Ext4, FAT16, FAT32, HFS, HFS+, JFS, Linux-swap, ReiserFS, Reiser4, UFS, XFS, and NTFS.

GParted is written in C++ and uses gtkmm to interface with GTK. The general approach is to keep the GUI as simple as possible and in conformity with the GNOME Human Interface Guidelines.

The GParted project provides a live operating system including GParted which can be written to a Live CD, a Live USB and other media. The operating system is based on Debian. GParted is also available on other Linux live CDs, including recent versions of Puppy, Knoppix, SystemRescueCd and Parted Magic. GParted is preinstalled when booting from "Try Ubuntu" mode on an Ubuntu installation media.

An alternative to this software is GNOME Disks.

== Supported features ==
GParted supports the following operations on file systems (provided that all features were enabled at compile-time and all required tools are present on the system). The 'copy' field indicates whether GParted is capable of cloning the mentioned filesystem.

| | Detect | Read | Create | Grow | Shrink | Move | Copy | Check | Label | UUID |
|---|---|---|---|---|---|---|---|---|---|---|
| APFS | Yes | No | No | No | No | Yes | Yes | No | No | No |
| Bcachefs | Yes | Yes | Yes | Yes | No | Yes | Yes | Yes | No | No |
| BitLocker | Yes | No | No | No | No | Yes | Yes | No | No | No |
| Btrfs | Yes | Yes | Yes | Yes | Yes | Yes | Yes | Yes | Yes | Yes |
| crypt / LUKS | Yes | Yes | No | Yes | Yes | Yes | Yes | No | No | No |
| exFAT | Yes | Yes | Yes | No | No | Yes | Yes | Yes | Yes | Yes |
| ext2 | Yes | Yes | Yes | Yes | Yes | Yes | Yes | Yes | Yes | Yes |
| ext3 | Yes | Yes | Yes | Yes | Yes | Yes | Yes | Yes | Yes | Yes |
| ext4 | Yes | Yes | Yes | Yes | Yes | Yes | Yes | Yes | Yes | Yes |
| F2FS | Yes | Yes | Yes | Yes | No | Yes | Yes | Yes | No | No |
| FAT16 | Yes | Yes | Yes | Yes | Yes | Yes | Yes | Yes | Yes | Yes |
| FAT32 | Yes | Yes | Yes | Yes | Yes | Yes | Yes | Yes | Yes | Yes |
| HFS | Yes | Yes | Yes | No | Yes | Yes | Yes | No | No | No |
| HFS+ | Yes | Yes | Yes | No | Yes | Yes | Yes | Yes | No | No |
| JFS | Yes | Yes | Yes | Yes | No | Yes | Yes | Yes | Yes | Yes |
| swap | Yes | Yes | Yes | Yes | Yes | Yes | Yes | No | Yes | Yes |
| LVM2 PV | Yes | Yes | Yes | Yes | Yes | Yes | No | Yes | No | No |
| NILFS2 | Yes | Yes | Yes | Yes | Yes | Yes | Yes | No | Yes | Yes |
| NTFS | Yes | Yes | Yes | Yes | Yes | Yes | Yes | Yes | Yes | Yes |
| ReFS | Yes | No | No | No | No | Yes | Yes | No | No | No |
| Reiser4 | Yes | Yes | Yes | No | No | Yes | Yes | Yes | No | No |
| ReiserFS | Yes | Yes | Yes | Yes | Yes | Yes | Yes | Yes | Yes | Yes |
| UDF | Yes | Yes | Yes | No | No | Yes | Yes | No | Yes | Yes |
| UFS | Yes | No | No | No | No | Yes | Yes | No | No | No |
| XFS | Yes | Yes | Yes | Yes | No | Yes | Yes | Yes | Yes | Yes |
| ZFS | Yes | No | No | No | No | Yes | Yes | No | No | No |

== Cloning with GParted ==
GParted is capable of cloning by copying and pasting. GParted is not capable of cloning an entire disk, but only one partition at a time. The file system being cloned should not be mounted. GParted clones partitions at the filesystem-level, and as a result is capable of cloning different target-size partitions for the same source, as long as the size of the source filesystem does not exceed the size of the target partition.

== See also ==
- Comparison of disk cloning software
- GNU Parted
- GNU GRUB
- KDE Partition Manager
- List of disk partitioning software
- Partition (computing)
