= Fdisk =

Command line utility of DOS and Microsoft Windows operating systems

fdisk
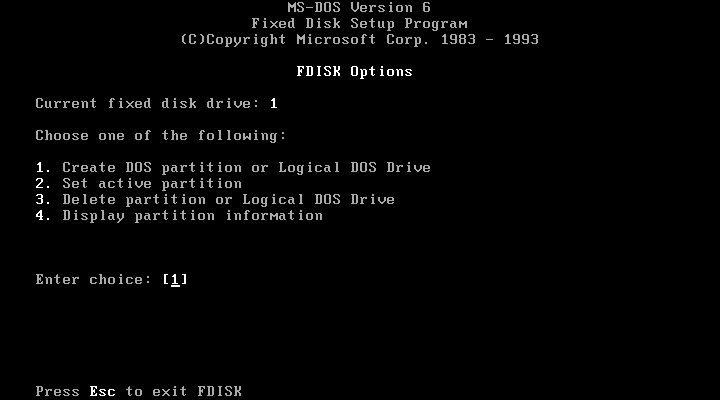
- Screenshot of FDISK on MS-DOS
- Developers: Robert Baron, IBM, Microsoft, Digital Research, Datalight, Novell, Brian E. Reifsnyder
- Initial release: 1983, 42–43 years ago
- Operating system: MS-DOS, PC DOS, FlexOS, SISNE plus, OS/2, eComStation, ArcaOS, Windows, DR DOS, ROM-DOS, FreeDOS, PTS-DOS, *BSD, SysV
- Type: Command
- License: MS-DOS, PC DOS, FlexOS, OS/2, Windows, DR DOS, ROM-DOS, PTS-DOS: Proprietary commercial software FreeDOS: GNU GPLv2

fdisk is a command-line utility for disk partitioning. It has been part of DOS, DR FlexOS, IBM OS/2, and early versions of Microsoft Windows, as well as certain ports of FreeBSD, NetBSD, OpenBSD, DragonFly BSD and macOS for compatibility reasons. Windows 2000 and its successors have replaced fdisk with a more advanced tool called diskpart.

== Implementations ==
=== DOS ===
IBM introduced the first version of fdisk (officially dubbed "Fixed Disk Setup Program") in March 1983, with the release of the IBM PC/XT computer (the first PC to store data on a hard disk) and the IBM PC DOS 2.0 operating system. fdisk version 1.0 can create one FAT12 partition, delete it, change the active partition, or display partition data. fdisk writes the master boot record, which supports up to four partitions. The other three were intended for other operating systems such as CP/M-86 and Xenix, which were expected to have their own partitioning utilities.

Microsoft first added fdisk to MS-DOS in version 3.2. MS-DOS versions 2.0 through 3.10 included OEM-specific partitioning tools, which may have been named fdisk.

PC DOS 3.0, released in August 1984, added support for FAT16 partitions to handle larger hard disks more efficiently. PC DOS 3.30, released in April 1987, added support for extended partitions. (These partitions do not store data directly but can contain up to 23 logical drives.) In both cases, fdisk was modified to work with FAT16 and extended partitions. Support for FAT16B was first added to Compaq's fdisk in MS-DOS 3.31. FAT16B later became available with MS-DOS and PC DOS 4.0.

The undocumented /mbr switch in fdisk, which could repair the master boot record, soon became popular.

IBM PC DOS 7.10 shipped with the new fdisk32 utility.

ROM-DOS, DR DOS 6.0 FlexOS, PTS-DOS 2000 Pro, and FreeDOS, include an implementation of the fdisk command.

=== Windows ===
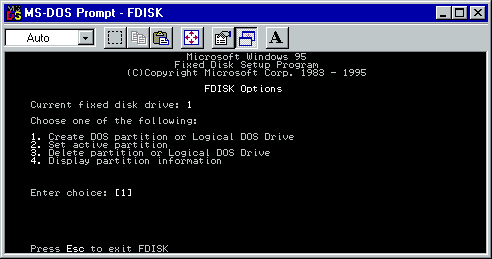
The fdisk command on Microsoft Windows 95

Windows 95, Windows 98, and Windows ME shipped with a derivative of the MS-DOS fdisk. Windows 2000 and its successors, however, came with the more advanced diskpart and the graphical Disk Management utilities.

Starting with Windows 95 OSR2, fdisk supports the FAT32 file system.

The version of fdisk that ships with Windows 95 does not report the correct size of a hard disk that is larger than 64 GB. An updated fdisk is available from Microsoft to correct this issue. In addition, fdisk cannot create partitions larger than 512 GB, even though FAT32 supports partitions as big as 2 TB. This limitation applies to all versions of fdisk supplied with Windows 95 OSR 2.1, Windows 98 and Windows ME.

=== IBM OS/2 ===
Before version 4.0, OS/2 shipped with two partition table managers. These were the text mode fdisk and the graphical fdiskpm. The two have identical functionality, and can manipulate both FAT partitions and the more advanced HPFS partitions.

OS/2 4.5 and higher (including eComStation and ArcaOS) can use the JFS file system, as well as FAT and HPFS. They replaced fdisk with the Logical Volume Manager (LVM).

=== Mach and 386BSD ===
fdisk for Mach Operating System was written by Robert Baron. It was ported to 386BSD by Julian Elischer, and the implementation is being used by FreeBSD, NetBSD and DragonFly BSD, all as of 2019, as well as the early versions of OpenBSD between 1995 and 1997 before OpenBSD 2.2.

Tobias Weingartner re-wrote fdisk in 1997 before OpenBSD 2.2, which has subsequently been forked by Apple Computer, Inc in 2002, and is still used as the basis for fdisk on macOS as of 2019.

For native partitions, BSD systems traditionally use BSD disklabel, and fdisk partitioning is supported only on certain architectures (for compatibility reasons) and only in addition to the BSD disklabel (which is mandatory).

=== Linux ===
In Linux, fdisk is a part of a standard package distributed by the Linux Kernel organization, util-linux. The original program was written by Andries E. Brouwer and A. V. Le Blanc and was later rewritten by Karel Zak and Davidlohr Bueso when they forked the util-linux package in 2006. An alternative, ncurses-based program, cfdisk, allows users to create partition layouts via a text-based user interface (TUI).

== See also ==
- List of disk partitioning software
- format (command)
- GUID Partition Table
