= Disk editor =

Computer software

Disk editor on Atari 8-bit SpartaDOS X system

A disk editor is a computer program that allows its user to read, edit, and write raw data (at character or hexadecimal, byte-levels) on disk drives (e.g., hard disks, USB flash disks or removable media such as a floppy disks); as such, they are sometimes called sector editors, since the read/write routines built into the electronics of most disk drives require to read/write data in chunks of sectors (usually 512 bytes). Many disk editors can also be used to edit the contents of a running computer's memory or a disk image.

Unlike hex editors, which are used to edit files, a disk editor allows access to the underlying disk structures, such as the master boot record (MBR) or GUID Partition Table (GPT), file system, and directories. On some operating systems (like Unix or Unix-like) most hex editors can act as disk editors just opening block devices instead of regular files. Programmers can use disk editors to understand these structures and test whether their implementation (e.g. of a file system) works correctly. Sometimes these structures are edited in order to provide examples for teaching data recovery and forensics, or in an attempt to hide data to achieve privacy or hide data from casual examiners. However, modifying such data structures gives only a weak level of protection and data encryption is the preferred method to achieve privacy.

Some disk editors include special functions which enable more comfortable ways to edit and fix file systems or other disk specific data structures. Furthermore, some include simple file browsers that can present the disk contents for partially corrupted file systems or file systems unknown to the operating system. These features can be used for example for file recovery.

== Partition editor ==
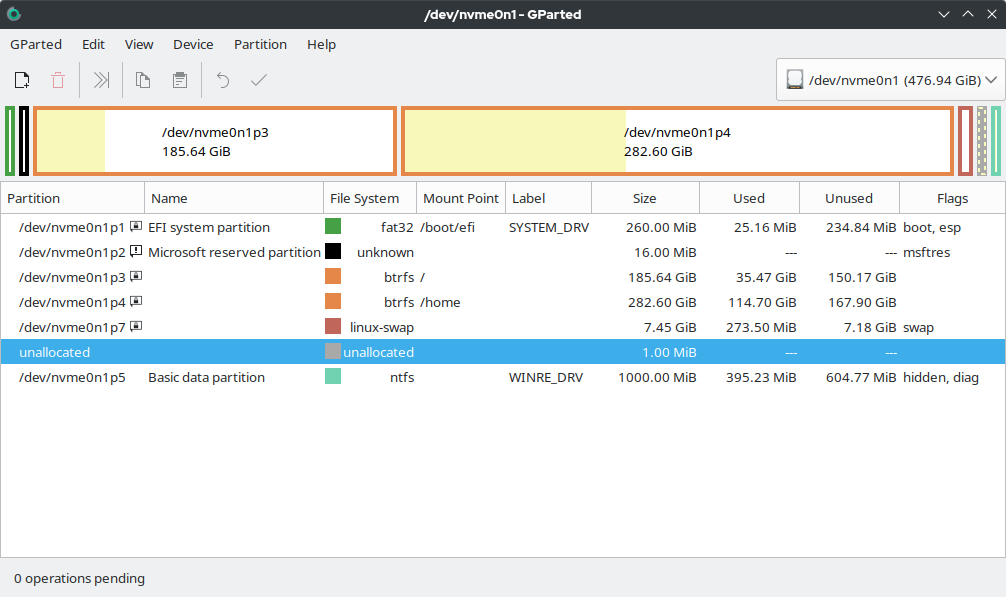
GParted is a popular partition editor

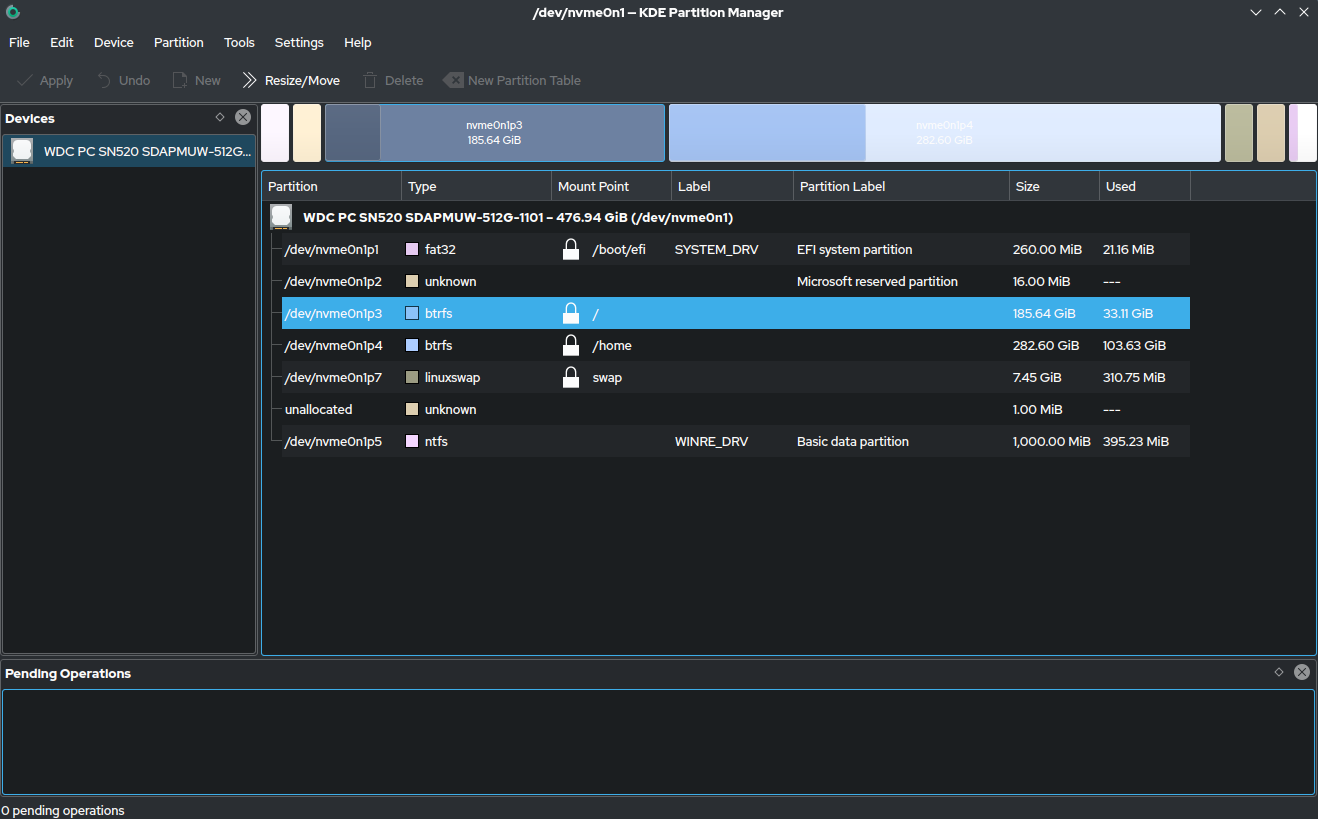
KDE Partition Manager is another popular partition editor

A partition editor (also called partitioning utility) is a kind of utility software designed to view, create, modify or delete disk partitions. A disk partition is a logical segment of the storage space on a storage device. By partitioning a large device into several partitions, it is possible to isolate various types of data from one another, and allow the coexistence of two or more operating systems simultaneously. Features and capabilities of partition editors vary, but generally they can create several partition on a disk, or one contiguous partition on several disks, at the discretion of the user. They can also, shrink a partition to allow more partitions created on a storage device, or delete one and expand an adjacent partition into the available space.

== See also ==
- Hex editor
- Comparison of hex editors
- SuperZap
