= Space Gremlin =

Disk space analysis tool for Mac OS X

- Developer: Sean Christmann
- Release: 2011
- Stable release: 1.2 / March 1, 2011; 15 years ago
- Operating system: Mac OS X
- Type: Disk Utility, Disk space analyzer
- License: Shareware
- Website: www.spacegremlinapp.com

Space Gremlin is a disk space analysis tool for Mac OS X.

== Functionality ==
Space Gremlin is designed to find large and unnecessary files to delete on a hard drive. It uses a squarified treemap algorithm to display the relative sizes of files and folders. It allows the user to zoom in and out of folder structures and mask out parts of the file system by toggling hidden or 'Ignored' files. Along with showing selected files in Finder, it provides the ability to compress or delete files directly within the application. Space Gremlin can also scan network drives and Windows share folders.

== History ==
Space Gremlin was created by Sean Christmann. One of the stated goals in developing the project was to provide features of the popular Windows program SpaceMonger for Mac OS X users. The application was released on February 7, 2011.
