= FolderSize =

Disk space analyzing software for Windows

Folder Size
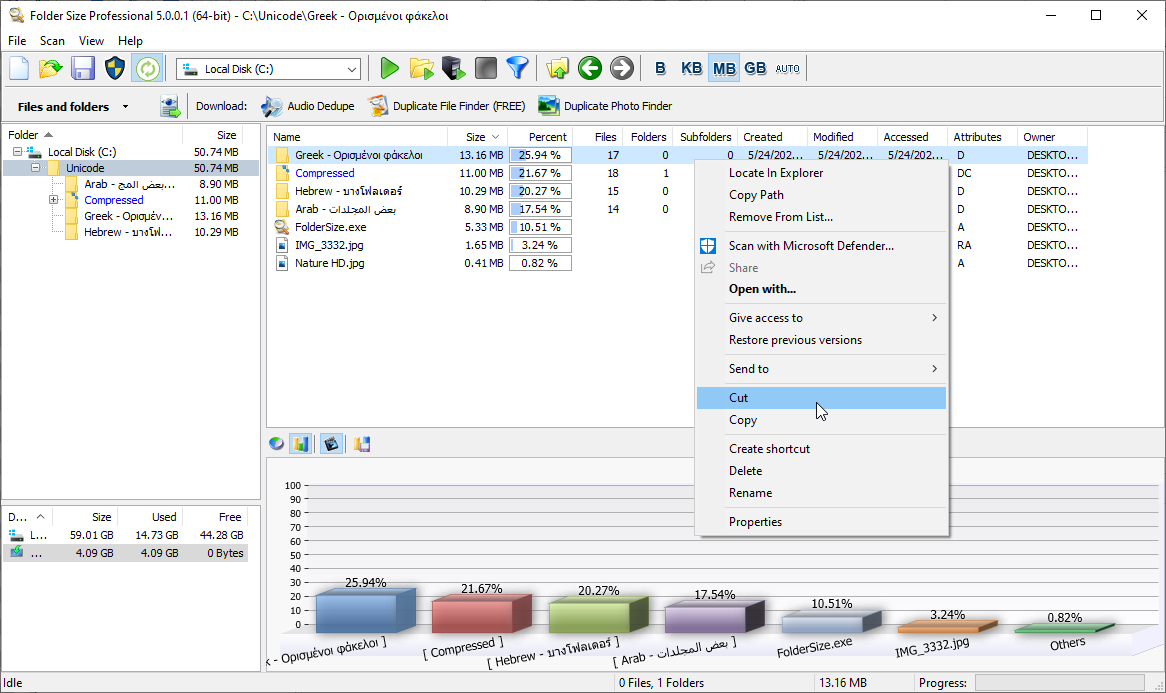
- Developer: MindGems
- Operating system: Microsoft Windows
- Platform: Intel x86 32-bit and x64
- Type: Disk space analyzer
- License: Freemium
- Website: mindgems.com/FolderSize

Folder Size is a freemium disk space analyzer for Windows written by MindGems Inc. The product uses a Windows Explorer-like interface shows data as a pie chart or a bar graph. There are both free and paid versions.

== Reception ==
According to Ian Harac of PCWorld.com, as of September 2, 2010, the product was a little more cumbersome than necessary but overall was considered to have an edge over Space Sniffer (a freeware alternative) because it had additional functionality and provided more information. In a subsequent 2014 review, Harac praised the software's interface and export options, calling it "fairly snappy," while criticizing its limited free-version export options and noting that some inactive Pro-version features appeared misleadingly active in the interface. The 2014 review concluded that the free version was worth recommending as-is.

CNET observed that the program is basic but noted that this is generally what is required of such programs. GroovyPost described it as a straightforward tool, noting its portable version and ease of use.
