= SpaceSniffer =

Computer disk space analyser

- A typical treemap produced by SpaceSniffer
- Developer: Uderzo Software
- Release: April 18, 2009
- Stable release: 2.2.0.27 / March 25, 2026; 6 months ago
- Operating system: Microsoft Windows
- Size: 2.9 MiB
- Available in: English
- Type: Disc space analyser
- License: Freeware
- Website: www.uderzo.it

SpaceSniffer is a freeware computer disk space analyser from Uderzo Software for Microsoft Windows platforms. It uses a treemap to visualise disk usage.

== History ==
Developed by Uderzo Software (run by Umberto Uderzo) in Italy, SpaceSniffer was first released in 2009.

== Features ==
SpaceSniffer comes in a single edition that runs on the Windows operating platform. The actual version comes only in 64-bit, although the homepage states that it runs on Windows 2000 and higher. A few older versions are available on the download page. The executable file can be simply copied without requiring any other installation process.

It is free for all uses, but donations are suggested. No source code is available.

Notable features include:

- A treemap represents how disk capacity is allocated.
- Filters (based on file name, age, size, etc.) enable the user to focus the visualisation on files and folders of interest.
- User-chosen colours can be associated to different file types.
- NTFS Alternate Data Streams are supported.
- commandline usage (non-graphical, console usage)

== Reception ==
The application has been reviewed favourably by editors and users. PCWorld concluded its review by pronouncing it a “recommended download” and Freewaregenius.com called it “a very well made program that is simple, intuitive, elegant, and very useful”.

Reviewers and users have noted that the treemap presentation “can be a bit overwhelming at times” or “cluttered and more complex than necessary” but concluded that it was “effective”.

== Similar programs ==
- For Windows WinDirStat, SequoiaView
- For KDE: KDirStat, which inspired WinDirStat
- For GTK: GdMap
- For Mac OS X: Disk Inventory X
