= Social visualization =

Way of perceiving information for social purposes

Social visualization is an interdisciplinary intersection of information visualization to study creating intuitive depictions of massive and complex social interactions for social purposes. By visualizing those interactions made not only in the cyberspace including social media but also the physical world, captured through sensors, it can reveal overall patterns of social memes or it highlights one individual's implicit behaviors in diverse social spaces. In particular, it is the study “primarily concerned with the visualization of text, audio, and visual interaction data to uncover social connections and interaction patterns in online and physical spaces. ACM Computing Classification System has classified this field of study under the category of Human-Centered Computing (1st) and Information Visualization (2nd) as a third level concept in a general sense.

== Overview ==
Social visualization is a subset of information visualization. According to Karrie G. Karahalios and Fernanda Viégas, one of the most distinctive aspect of social visualization is that "social visualization focuses on people, the groups they form, their patterns, their interactions, and how they related to their communities." rather than other digital information. In this perspective, there are many challenges and questions drives this field of study to the interdisciplinary research context, ranging from the analytical (what are the most relevant and appropriate data and is it right to use data in terms of privacy?) to the critical (what do the patterns imply and does it allow us to demonstrate it publicly? ) to the creative (how can we both accurately represent the implication the data and also express its intrinsic meaning through fundamental visual design principles) perspectives. One of the common misperception of social visualization is that the relationship between Network Analysis or Social Network Visualization and Social Visualization; they are loosely related. Social network visualization is a traditional form of social visualization. It is more appropriate to consider in the context of visualization in social sciences. i.e. John Snow's maps of the 1854 cholera outbreak in Soho and Charles Booth's maps of poverty in London 1889 Due to the interdisciplinary nature, research methodology in this field is truly diversified from researchers to researchers; they adopt related technology used in computer science from data mining, machine learning, natural language processing to statistical models widely recognized in social science/communication, so that they could capture, process, analyze and represent its essence.

== Historical background ==
There has been a long history of visualization in a social science perspective, which enables us to witness the power of social visualizations and their implications. However, changes in visualization methodology and tools in the last few decades are fundamentally affecting the way in which the social sciences and computational social science are researched, and in which studies are communicated (Olson 1997). These changes have been largely initiated by the rapid development of computing power and visualization technology since the 1980s, resulting in the availability of affordable computing and visualization. Many researchers had contributed to define and understand the potential power of this field with emerging media and information. In this regard, McCormick et al. indicates a visualization as offering "a method for seeing the unseen. (McCormick et al. 1989)" After that, many computer scientists dedicated their academic careers for nurturing the field of social visualization with strong emphasis on applying computational methods.

== See also ==
- Human–computer interaction
- Infographic
- Information visualization
- Social network analysis
- Social science
- Theory of Visualization
- Visual analytics
- Visualization (computer graphics)
