= Fernanda Viégas =

Brazilian-American computer scientist (born 1971)

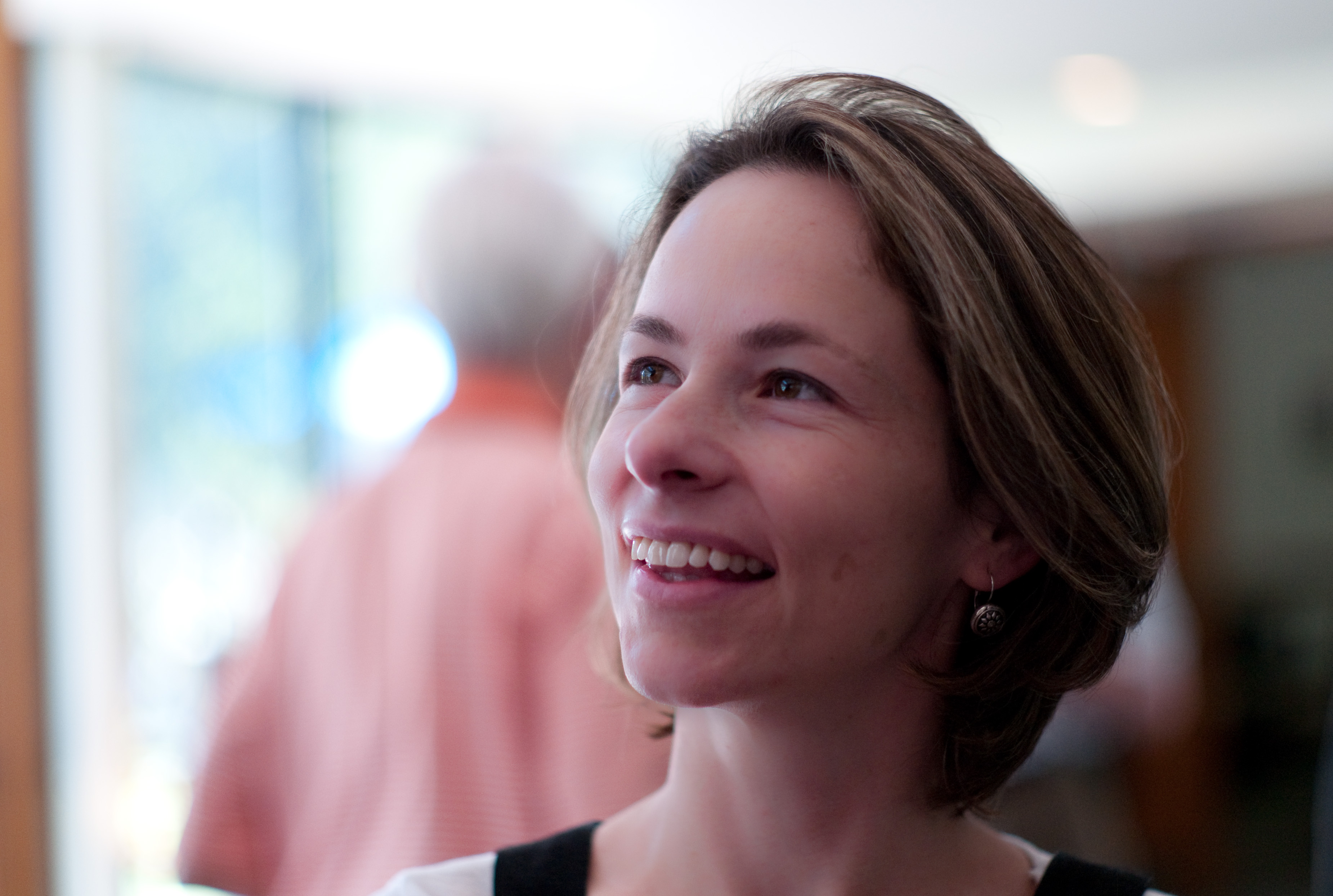
- Viégas in 2009
- Born: Fernanda Bertini Viégas; 1971 (age 54–55); Brazil
- Education: Ph.D. Media Arts & Sciences, MIT Media Laboratory
- Employer(s): IBM Research; Google
- Known for: History Flow, Many Eyes, Chat Circles
- Scientific career
- Fields: visualization, design, interactive art, journalism
- Doctoral advisor: Judith Donath

Fernanda Bertini Viégas (born 1971) is a Brazilian computer scientist and graphical designer, whose work focuses on the social, collaborative and artistic aspects of information visualization.

== Biography ==
Viégas studied graphic design and art history at the University of Kansas, where she obtained her bachelor's degree in 1997. She then moved to the MIT Media Lab, where she received an M.S. in 2000 and a Ph.D. in Media Arts and Sciences in 2005 under the supervision of Judith Donath. The same year she began work at IBM's Thomas J. Watson Research Center in Cambridge, Massachusetts, as part of the Visual Communication Lab.

In April 2010, she and Martin M. Wattenberg started a new venture called Flowing Media, Inc., to focus on visualization aimed at consumers and mass audiences. Four months later, both of them joined Google as the co-leaders of the Google's "Big Picture" data visualization group in Cambridge, Massachusetts.

== Work ==
=== Social visualization ===
Viégas began her research while at the MIT Media Lab, focusing on graphical interfaces for online communication. Her Chat Circles system introduced ideas such as proximity-based filtering of conversation and a visual archive of chat history displaying the overall rhythm and form of a conversation. Her email visualization designs (including PostHistory and Themail) are the foundation for many other systems; her findings on how visualizations are often used for storytelling influenced subsequent work on the collaborative aspects of visualization. While at MIT, she also studied usage of Usenet and blogs.

=== Collective intelligence and public visualization ===
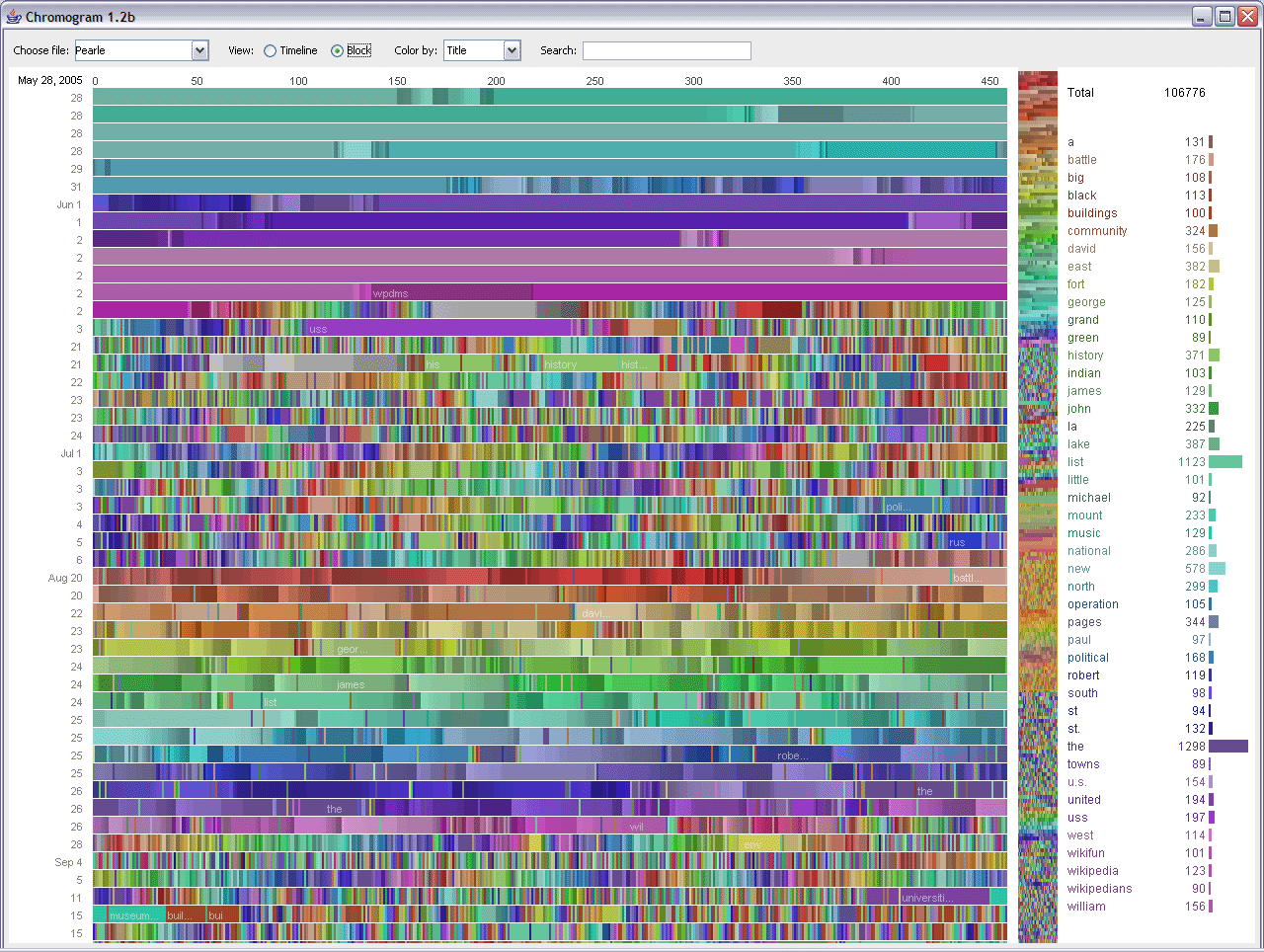
Fernanda Viégas, "Chromogram," 2006

A second stream of work, in partnership with Martin Wattenberg, centers on collective intelligence and the public use of data visualization.

Her work with visualizations such as History Flow and Chromogram led to some of the earliest publications on the dynamics of Wikipedia, including the first scientific study of the repair of vandalism.

Viégas is one of the founders of IBM's experimental Many Eyes website, created in 2007, which seeks to make visualization technology accessible to the public. In addition to broad uptake from individuals, the technology from Many Eyes has been used by nonprofits and news outlets such as the New York Times Visualization Lab.

=== Art ===
Viégas is also known for her artistic work, which explores the medium of visualization for explorations of emotionally charged digital data. An early example is Artifacts of the Presence Era, an interactive installation at the Boston Center for the Arts in 2003, which featured a video-based timeline of visitor interactions with the museum.

She often works with Martin Wattenberg to visualize emotionally charged information. An example of these works is their piece "Web Seer", which is a visualization of Google Suggest. The Fleshmap series (started in 2008) uses visualization to portray aspects of sensuality, and includes work on the web, video, and installations. In 2012, she launched the Wind Map project, which displays continuously updated forecasts of wind patterns across the United States.

Works by Viégas and Wattenberg are in the collection of the Museum of Modern Art, and were include in Pirouette: Turning Points in Design, a 2025 exhibition that features "widely recognized design icons ... highlighting pivotal moments in design history."

== Publications ==
- Chat Circles. Fernanda B. Viégas and Judith Donath. ACM Conference on Computer-Human Interaction (CHI), 1999
- Visualizing Conversations, Judith Donath, Karrie Karahalios and Fernanda B. Viégas . Journal of Computer-Mediated Communication, Vol. 4, Number 4, June 1999
- Studying Cooperation and Conflict between Authors with history flow Visualizations. Fernanda B. Viégas, Martin Wattenberg, and Kushal Dave. ACM Conference on Computer-Human Interaction (CHI), 2004
- Many Eyes: A Site for Visualization at Internet Scale. Fernanda B. Viégas, Martin Wattenberg, Frank van Ham, Jesse Kriss, Matt McKeon. IEEE Symposium on Information Visualization, 2007
- "Luscious". Fernanda Viégas & Martin Wattenberg. Book chapter in Net Works: Case Studies in Web Art and Design. Ed. xtine burrough, Routledge 2011
- "Beautiful History". Fernanda Viégas & Martin Wattenberg. Book chapter in Beautiful Visualization: Looking at Data Through the Eyes of Experts. Ed. Julie Steele, Noah Iliinsky. O'Reilly Media, 2010.
