= Disk Inventory X =

Disk space analyzer software

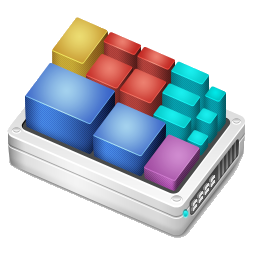

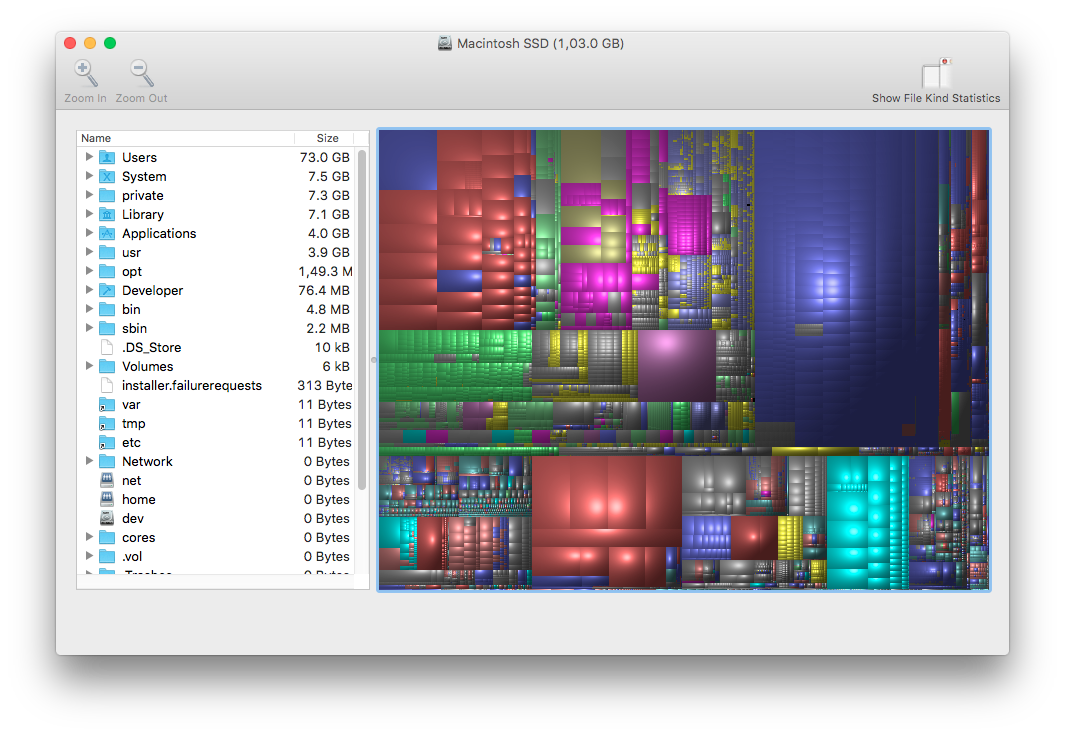
- A screenshot of version 1.0
- Initial release: March 7, 2004
- Stable release: 1.3 / December 8, 2019; 6 years ago
- Operating system: macOS
- Size: 2,075 KiB
- Available in: English
- Type: Disk space manager
- License: GPL
- Website: www.derlien.com

Disk Inventory X is a disk space analyzer utility for Mac OS X 10.3 and later. Inspired by WinDirStat, it shows the sizes of files and folders in a graphical treemap.

Version 1.3 of Disk Inventory X added support for macOS 10.15 Catalina, while the earlier version 1.2 added support for macOS 10.14 Mojave and its dark mode feature.

== Reception ==
- Mark Frauenfelder, founder of Boingboing, wrote in his book, Rule the Web: how to do anything and everything on the Internet—better, Disk Inventory X was his favorite way of uncovering disk-hogging files.
- Download.com gave it 4 out of 5.
