= Ncdu =

Disk utility program

NCurses Disk Usage
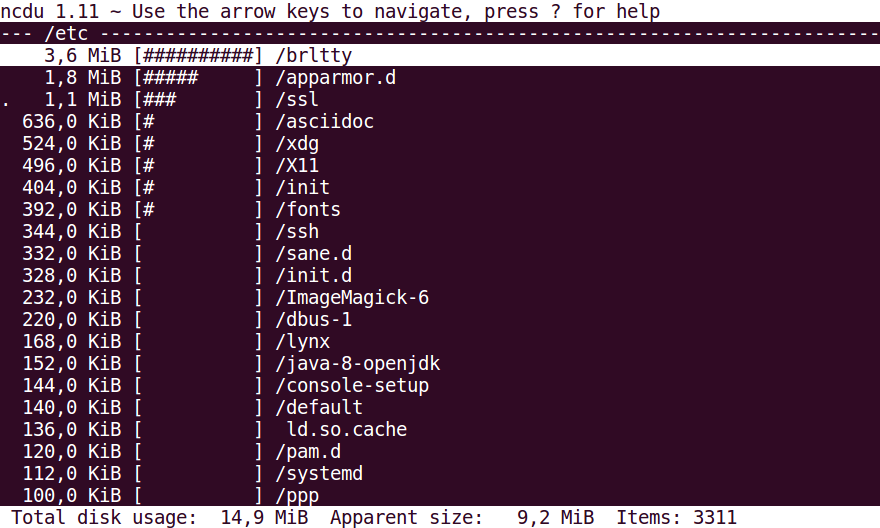
- Developer: Yoran Heling
- Release: February 21, 2007; 19 years ago
- Stable release: 2.9.2 / 24 October 2025; 12 months ago
- Written in: C (version 1.x), Zig (version 2.x)
- Operating system: Linux, BSD, UNIX
- Platform: POSIX
- Type: Disk utility
- License: MIT License
- Website: dev.yorhel.nl/ncdu
- Repository: g.blicky.net/ncdu.git

ncdu (NCurses Disk Usage) is a disk utility for Unix systems. Its name refers to its similar purpose to the du utility, but ncdu uses a text-based user interface under the ncurses programming library. Users can navigate the list using the arrow keys and delete files that are taking up too much space by pressing the 'd' key. It provides a swift and efficient way to view directories that are taking up disk space, and was primarily meant for remote shells. It runs on UNIX-based systems, such as Linux, BSD, and POSIX. Users can install ncdu by running a package manager command in their terminal emulator (i.e. for Debian-based systems, apt install ncdu). Version 1.09 and later can export the file listing in JSON format.

ncdu was developed by Yoran Heling to learn C and to serve as a disk usage analyzer on remote systems over ssh. Version 2.0 of the program brought a full rewrite in the Zig programming language.
