= Sugarwish =

Online gifting platform founded in 2012

- Website type: Online gifting platform
- Available in: English
- Headquarters: Denver, Colorado
- Owners: Sugarwish, LLC
- Creators: Elisabeth Vezzani; Leslie Lyon
- Website: sugarwish.com
- Commercial: Yes
- Registration: Required
- Launched: 2012
- Current status: Active

Sugarwish is an online gifting platform that allows receivers to customize their gift.

== History ==
Sugarwish was founded in 2012 in Denver, Colorado by Elisabeth Vezzani and Leslie Lyon to make gifting more personalized for recipients, initially focused on candies. A beta version of the website was launched in late 2012 and two months later it was featured on the Today Show, which increased its user base.

In 2015, Sugarwish joined MergeLane, a Boulder-based startup accelerator for women-founded companies, which led it to focus on corporate gifting. In 2017, it added Popcorn and cookies as a gift option.

In 2020, during COVID-19, Sugarwish began an initiative to allow the donation of a gift to Make-A-Wish America, and in 2021 it began a formal partnership with the Sugarwish platform.

In 2021, Sugarwish acquired Vinebox, a San Francisco-based wine platform, and began selling customizable wine gifts. In 2022, Sugarwish expanded its operations and opened a twenty-thousand-square-foot warehouse in Englewood, Colorado to handle the gift operations. Later that year, it developed WishLinks which allows businesses to send customized links of their gifts.

== Platform ==
Sugarwish operates an online gifting platform that allows senders to send a gift by text, email, or other messaging services. Senders can specify a gift size, eCard design, and gift category. After receiving their eCard, recipients can select from specific categories such as candy, cookies, snacks, brownies, popcorn, coffees and tea samplers, candles, spa gifts, and bottled wines and cocktails.
