= VINEBOX =

- Industry: Wine
- Founded: 2015; 11 years ago
- Founder: Matt Dukes; Rachel Vodofsky
- Headquarters: San Francisco
- Owner: Sugarwish (2021-present)
- Website: www.getvinebox.com

VINEBOX is a San Francisco based online monthly subscription service that sends its subscribers three glasses of wines every month. Based in San Francisco, California, USA, the company was acquired by Sugarwish in 2021.

== History ==
VINEBOX was founded in San Francisco in 2015 by Matt Dukes and Rachel Vodofsky. The pair previously worked as lawyers with a passion for wine and technology. In January 2016, the company joined Y Combinator's accelerator program and started shipping wines to their members. With their own money, they started the operations and in March 2016, they received initial funding of $1.25 million. In November 2016, VINEBOX launched "12 Nights of Wine", an advent calendar for wine, which sold out within 4 weeks. The wines come from vineyards across France, Spain, Italy, Germany, California, Oregon, and Washington.

== Service and membership ==
Consumers may choose an assortment of wines from Vinebox. The company sources top winemakers from Europe and contains them in 10 cl vials. It is packaged in a box which includes a booklet of information about each wine. Consumers may decide which they like most so they can order a full bottle. Vinebox may also suggest similar options.

Vinebox offers three membership plans, which can be upgraded or downgraded. The membership service first launched in September 2015 and for a fixed monthly fee, Vinebox send curated box containing three separate variety of wine.
