= Andrew B. Lippman =

American computer scientist

Andrew Lippman
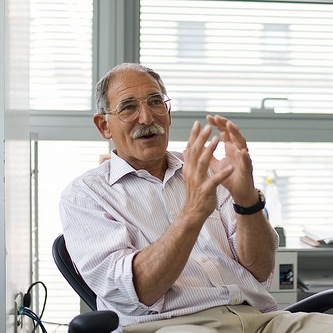
- Andrew Lippman in 2011
- Born: New York City, U.S.
- Education: Massachusetts Institute of Technology; École Polytechnique Fédérale de Lausanne
- Known for: MIT Media Lab
- Scientific career
- Thesis: Re-inventing television (1995)
- Doctoral advisor: Murat Kunt
- Doctoral students: Judith Donath
- Website: web.media.mit.edu/~lip/

Andrew Benjamin Lippman is a senior research scientist at the MIT Media Lab as well as a Co-Director of various chairs at the institute. He has a more than thirty-year history at MIT. His work at the Media Lab has ranged from wearable computers to global digital television. Currently, he heads the Lab's Viral Communications group, which examines scalable, real-time networks whose capacity increases with the number of members.

== Education and career ==
Lippman received both his BS and MS in Electrical Engineering from MIT. In 1995 he completed his PhD studies at the EPFL, Lausanne, Switzerland. He holds seven patents in television and digital image processing. His current research interests are in the design of flexible, interactive digital television infrastructure.

Lippman has directed research programs on digital pictures, personal computers, entertainment, and graphics. He was the principal investigator for the pioneering 1978 computerized hypermedia project, the Aspen Movie Map, which functioned much like Google Street View of decades later. Currently, he is on the science councils of both non-profit and for-profit companies addressing global information infrastructures. Lippman established and directs the Digital Life consortium, which works to create a networked world where communication becomes fully embedded in our daily lives. He has written both technical and lay articles about our digital future and given over 250 presentations throughout the world on the future of information and its commercial and social impact.
