= Eric Gilbert =

American computer scientist

- Education: University of Illinois at Urbana-Champaign (BS, PhD)
- Known for: social computing social media human-computer interaction
- Scientific career
- Fields: Computer Science; Computer-mediated communication; Human-computer interaction; Social media; Social computing
- Workplaces: University of Michigan; Georgia Tech
- Thesis: Computing Tie Strength (2011)
- Doctoral advisor: Karrie Karahalios
- Website: eegilbert.org

Eric Gilbert is an American computer scientist and the John Derby Evans Associate Professor in the University of Michigan School of Information, with a courtesy appointment in CSE. He is known for his work designing and analyzing social media.

== Education and early life ==
Gilbert received a B.S. with highest distinction in mathematics and computer ccience from the University of Illinois at Urbana-Champaign in 2001. While in college, Gilbert worked as a software engineer on the influential social and learning computing system PLATO. After completing his undergraduate work, he served in Teach For America as a math and computer science teacher at Paul Robeson High School in Chicago. Gilbert obtained a Ph.D. in computer science from the University of Illinois at Urbana-Champaign in 2011.

== Career and research ==
Gilbert joined the School of Interactive Computing within the Georgia Institute of Technology College of Computing in 2011 as an assistant professor. There, he led the comp.social lab. After receiving tenure in 2017 at Georgia Tech, Gilbert moved to the School of Information at the University of Michigan as the John Derby Evans Endowed Professor of Information in 2018. He is also appointed within Computer Science and Engineering at Michigan.

Gilbert has made foundational contributions to the fields of social computing and HCI. His research focuses on studying existing—as well as designing new—social media systems. According to Google Scholar, Gilbert's work has been cited over 14,000 times, and he has an h-index of 44.

== Media ==
Gilbert's research—for example on Reddit, Twitter, and Facebook—is frequently covered in the mainstream press.

== Awards and honors ==
During his PhD work, Gilbert won the inaugural Google Ph.D. Fellowship. Gilbert was one of the recipients of the National Science Foundation CAREER Awards in 2016, the Sigma Xi Young Faculty Award in 2015, and the UIUC CS Distinguished Alumni Award in 2018. In 2023, he became an ACM Distinguished Member.

Gilbert has also won 5 best paper awards from ACM SIGCHI conferences, and received 6 best paper honorable mentions.

== Selected works ==
- Jhaver, Shagun, Amy Bruckman, and Eric Gilbert. "Does Transparency in Moderation Really Matter? User Behavior After Content Removal Explanations on Reddit." Proceedings of the ACM on Human-Computer Interaction 3. CSCW (2019): 1-27.
- Chandrasekharan, Eshwar, et al. "The Internet's Hidden Rules: An Empirical Study of Reddit Norm Violations at Micro, Meso, and Macro Scales." Proceedings of the ACM on Human-Computer Interaction 2. CSCW (2018): 1-25.
- Chandrasekharan, Eshwar, et al. "You Can't Stay Here: The Efficacy of Reddit's 2015 Ban Examined Through Hate Speech." Proceedings of the ACM on Human-Computer Interaction 1. CSCW (2017): 1-22.
- Mitra, Tanushree, Graham Wright, and Eric Gilbert. "Credibility and the Dynamics of Collective Attention." Proceedings of the ACM on Human-Computer Interaction 1. CSCW (2017): 1-17.
- Hutto, Clayton J., and Eric Gilbert. "Vader: A parsimonious rule-based model for sentiment analysis of social media text." Eighth international AAAI conference on weblogs and social media. 2014.
- Gilbert, Eric, and Karrie Karahalios. "Predicting tie strength with social media." Proceedings of the SIGCHI conference on human factors in computing systems. 2009.
- Gilbert, Eric, and Karrie Karahalios. "Widespread worry and the stock market." Fourth International AAAI Conference on Weblogs and Social Media. 2010.
