= Disk Usage Analyzer =

Graphical disk usage analyzer for GNOME

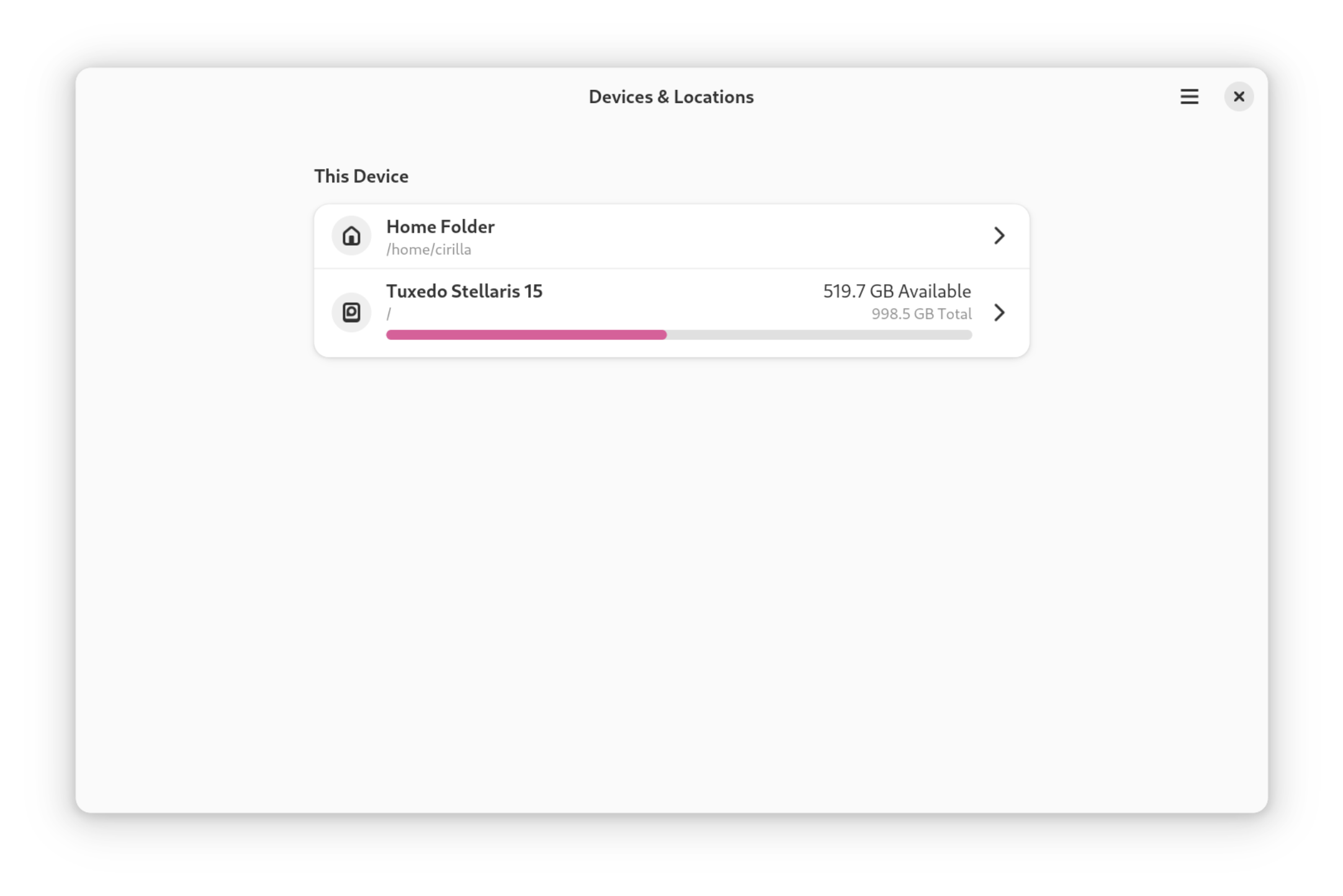
- Screenshot of Disk Usage Analyzer
- Original author: Fabio Marzocca
- Developer: Paolo Borelli
- Stable release: 50.0 / 13 March 2026; 3 months ago
- Operating system: UNIX-like
- Type: Disk utility
- License: GNU General Public License
- Website: apps.gnome.org/Baobab/
- Repository: gitlab.gnome.org/GNOME/baobab.git

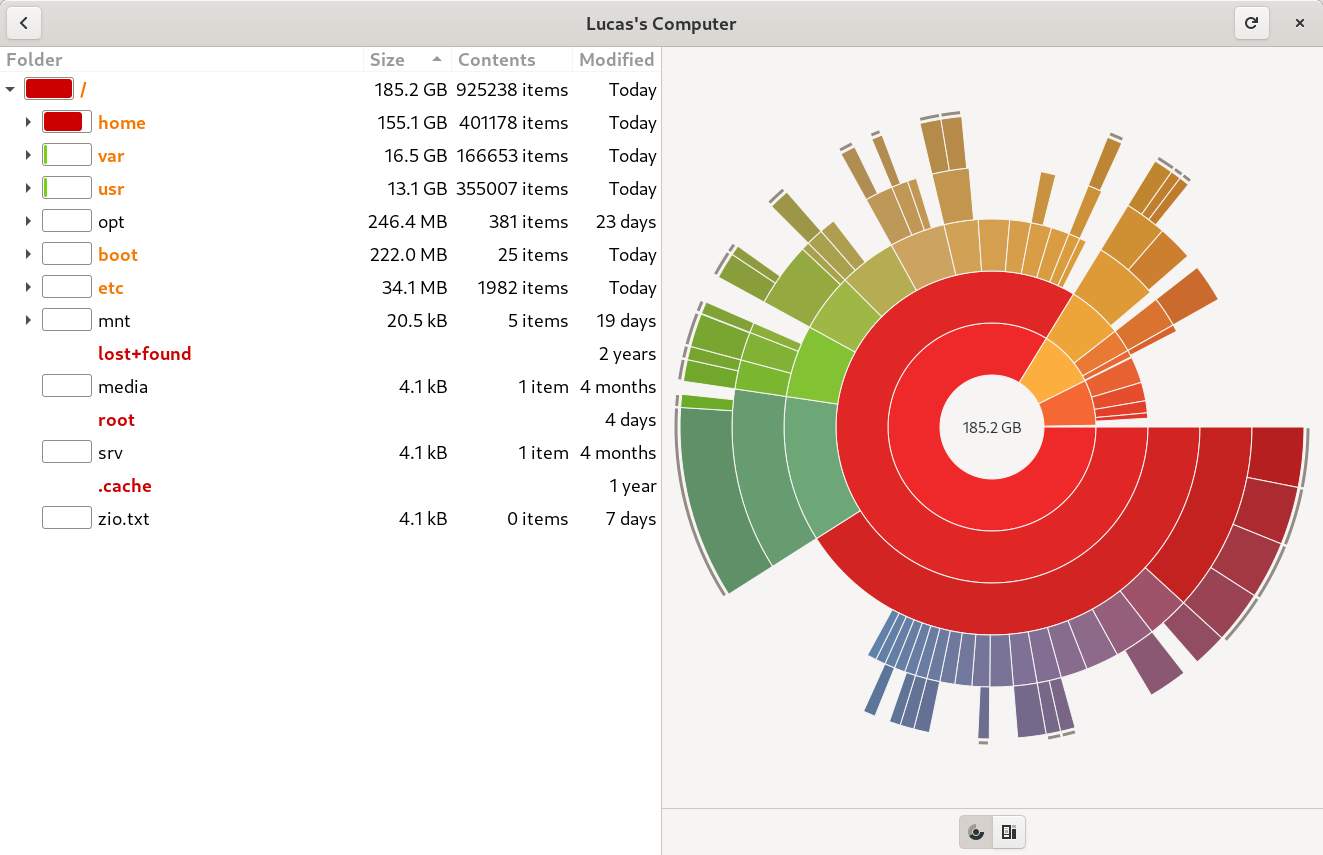
The alternative treemap chart view represents files as rings

Disk Usage Analyzer is a graphical disk usage analyzer for GNOME. It is part of GNOME Core Applications. It was originally named Baobab after the Adansonia tree. The software gives the user a menu-driven, graphical representation of what is on a disk drive. The interface allows for selection of specific parts of filesystem being scanned so a single folder, the entire filesystem, and even remote folders and filesystems can be scanned. The graphical representation can be switched between a ring chart and a treemap chart so the presentation can be tailored to the specific content being scanned.

In 2012, Disk Usage Analyzer was rewritten in Vala.

== Features ==
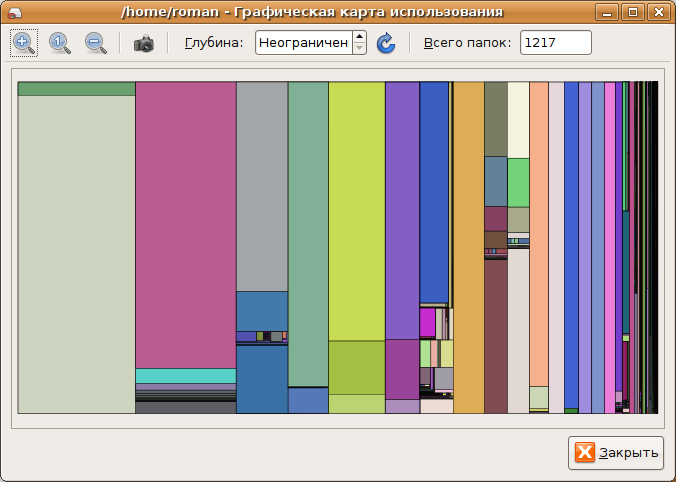
Baobab Graphical Disk Usage Map

The program can scan an entire file system or a specific directory, either local or located on a remote computer. Each directory can be opened in the Nautilus file manager or moved to the Trash. It also allows users to monitor changes in the file system in real time. Another feature is the disk usage map, which provides a graphical representation of the subdirectory tree of a selected directory and the amount of disk space used by each component. Earlier versions of the program included a file system search function; this feature was later removed.

== Future ==
At the GNOME Users And Developers European Conference (GUADEC) in 2013, a plan to merge the Disk Usage Analyzer with gnome-system-monitor to a new program called Usage was presented.
