= IBM History Flow tool =

Data visualization tool

IBM's History Flow tool is a visualization tool for a time-sequence of snapshots of a document in various stages of its creation. The tool supports tracking contributions to the article by different users and can identify which parts of a document have remained unchanged throughout many full-document revisions. The tool was developed by Fernanda Viégas, Martin Wattenberg, Jonathan Feinberg, and Kushal Dave of IBM's Collaborative User Experience research group.

IBM Research has analyzed Wikipedia usage and edits using a history flow tool. The tool is no longer available for download from the IBM Research website. However, a similar tool referencing it is available on GitHub. A similar application have been released.
