= Martin M. Wattenberg =

American artist and computer researcher (born 1970)

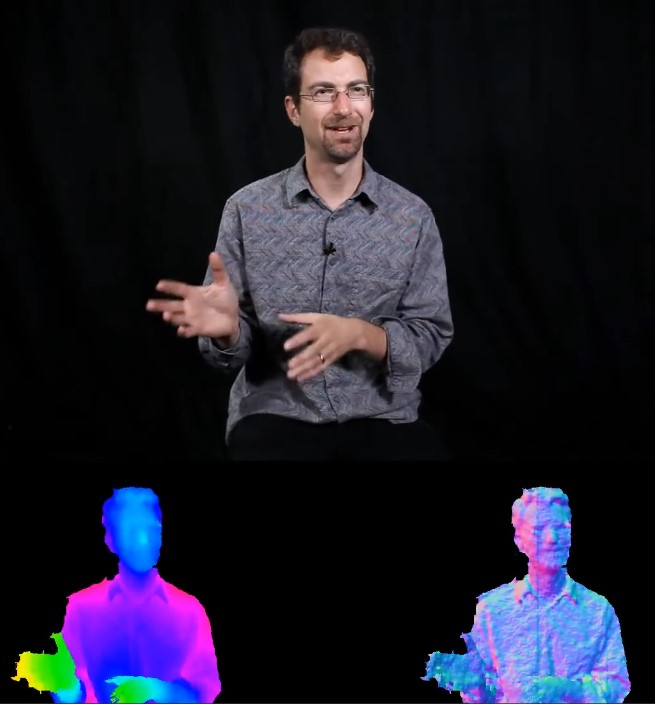
- Wattenberg in 2014
- Born: 1970 (age 55–56); United States
- Education: Brown University; Stanford University; University of California, Berkeley
- Known for: History Flow, Many Eyes, Treemap algorithms, Social Data Analysis
- Awards: Gold award / ID Magazine Interactive Design (1999), TR100 (2003)
- Scientific career
- Fields: Visualization, interactive art, journalism
- Workplaces: IBM Research; Google; Harvard University
- Thesis: Generic families of dynamical systems on the circle (1996)

Martin Miles Wattenberg (born 1970) is an American scientist and artist known for his work with data visualization. He is currently the Gordon McKay Professor of Computer Science at the Harvard University School of Engineering and Applied Sciences.

Along with Fernanda Viégas, he worked at the Cambridge location of IBM's Thomas J. Watson Research Center as part of the Visual Communication Lab, and created Many Eyes. In April 2010, Wattenberg and Viégas started a new venture called Flowing Media, Inc., to focus on visualization aimed at consumers and mass audiences. Four months later, both of them joined Google as the co-leaders of the Google's "Big Picture" data visualization group in Cambridge, Massachusetts.

== Biography ==
Wattenberg grew up in Amherst, Massachusetts. He received an A.B. from Brown University in 1991, an M.S. from Stanford University in 1992, and a Ph.D. in Mathematics from U.C. Berkeley in 1996 under Charles C. Pugh with a thesis titled Generic families of dynamical systems on the circle. From 1996 through 2002, he lived in New York City and worked for Dow Jones, on the personal finance and investing site SmartMoney.com. In 2002 he took a position at IBM's Thomas J. Watson Research Center, in its Cambridge, Massachusetts location; in 2004, he founded IBM Research's Visual Communication Lab. In Fall 2021 Wattenberg joined Harvard University as Gordon McKay Professor of Computer Science.

== Journalism ==
While at SmartMoney.com, Wattenberg focused on new forms of interactive web-based journalism. Early work in 1996–1997 ranged from service pieces, such as worksheets to guide financial decisions, to expository graphical narratives on subjects such as bond yield curves. In 1998 Wattenberg created the Map of the Market, which visualized the stock price performance of hundreds of publicly traded companies. The Map was the first web-based treemap and was widely imitated. Subsequently, Wattenberg started a research and development group at SmartMoney, which was responsible for interactive charts, graphs, and simulations, as well as a library of visualization components. Outside of his work at Dow Jones, Wattenberg is known for interactive visualizations that have introduced mass audiences to data sets ranging from baby names to museum collections at NASA and the Smithsonian.

== Visualization research ==
=== Collaborative analysis and collective intelligence ===
Wattenberg (CLOUDS, 2014)

Wattenberg, in partnership with Fernanda Viégas at IBM, has published widely on collective intelligence and the social use of data visualization. Their work with visualizations such as History Flow and Chromogram led to some of the earliest publications on the dynamics of Wikipedia, including the first scientific study of the repair of vandalism.

Wattenberg is one of the founders of IBM's experimental Many Eyes web site, created in 2007 which seeks to make visualization technology accessible to the public. In addition to broad uptake from individuals, the technology from Many Eyes has been used by nonprofits and news outlets such as the New York Times Visualization Lab.

=== Visualization techniques and theory ===
Wattenberg & Viégas (2016)

Wattenberg invented or co-invented many visualization techniques. The Map of the Market was based on a new algorithm for treemap layouts (see Treemapping). The Arc Diagram is a novel technique for visualizing structure in long sequences, closely related to linear embeddings of networks, a technique that has since been used by many other designers. Wattenberg and Viégas together introduced several techniques for depicting text: in addition to the history flow technique described above, the two created such text visualizations as the Word Tree and Chromogram. With collaborator Zan Armstrong, Wattenberg developed a new way to visualize Simpson's paradox.

== Artwork ==
As an artist, Wattenberg uses interactive graphics and visualization as expressive media. He has primarily worked on internet-accessible projects, but has also created installations, videos, and prints.

In the 1990s he began to work with information visualization as an artistic medium. For example, his Shape of Song series (1999–2002) depicted the form of musical compositions; this project exists online as well as in prints that have been exhibited in multiple venues. Starrynight (1999), a collaboration with Alexander Galloway and Mark Tribe, provided a new form of social, visual navigation for an online discussion. Idealine (2001), an interactive representation of the online art universe, was the first internet artwork commissioned by the Whitney Museum of American Art, as well as a very early example of an artwork that used "crowdsourcing" to gather data. Wattenberg has also worked with Golan Levin, contributing to the visualization technique used in The Secret Lives of Numbers (2002).

Wattenberg frequently works with Marek Walczak, with whom he formed a collaboration known as MW2MW. A key theme of their work is the relationship between language and space. For example, Apartment took inspiration from the concept of a memory palace, turning free-form text entered by a viewer into an architectural floorplan. The piece has appeared in many versions, including online (2000), an installation at the Whitney Museum of American Art (2001) and in many other venues. Other works explore the possibilities of interaction: the Thinking Machine series (2004–2008), for example, is based on a chess-playing program that attempts to best the viewer while displaying its own thinking process.

Since 2003, Wattenberg has collaborated with Fernanda Viégas to create interactive works that evoke the joy of "revelation". They have used academic techniques such as history flow to create prints that have been shown in venues such as the New York Museum of Modern Art. The two have also created purely artistic visualizations. For example, the Fleshmap series (2008–2009) portrays aspects of sensuality, and includes work on the web, video, and installations. For example, Fleshmap: Touch provides a collective view of erogenous zones, while Fleshmap: Listen visualizes the language used to describe the body in song lyrics.

Works by Viégas and Wattenberg are in the collection of the Museum of Modern Art, and were include in Pirouette: Turning Points in Design, a 2025 exhibition that features "widely recognized design icons [...] highlighting pivotal moments in design history."

== Publications ==
Key publications:

- 2007: Many Eyes: A Site for Visualization at Internet Scale. Fernanda B. Viégas, Martin Wattenberg, Frank van Ham, Jesse Kriss, Matt McKeon. IEEE Symposium on Information Visualization.
- 2005: Baby Names, Visualization, and Social Data Analysis Martin Wattenberg. IEEE Symposium on Information Visualization.
- 2004: Studying Cooperation and Conflict between Authors with history flow Visualizations. Fernanda B. Viégas, Martin Wattenberg, and Kushal Dave. ACM Conference on Computer-Human Interaction (CHI).
- 2002: Ordered and quantum treemaps: Making effective use of 2D space to display hierarchies Ben Bederson, Ben Shneiderman, and Martin Wattenberg. ACM Transactions on Graphics, Vol 21, No. 4.
