= E-card =

Electronic postcard or greeting card

E-card is an electronic postcard or greeting card, with the primary difference being that it is created using digital media instead of paper or other traditional materials. E-cards are available in many different mediums, usually on various Internet sites. They can be sent to a recipient virtually, usually via e-mail or an instant messaging service.

Since e-cards are digital "content", they are highly editable, allowing them to be extensively personalized by the sender. They are also capable of presenting animated GIFs or videos.

== Technological evolution ==
Since its conception in 1994 by Judith Donath, the technology behind the E-card has changed significantly. One technical aspect that remained mostly constant until 2019 was the delivery mechanism: the e-mail received by the recipient contains not the E-card itself, but an individually coded link back to the publisher's website that displays the sender's card.

== History ==
The greeting card metaphor was employed early in the life of the World Wide Web. The first postcard site, The Electric Postcard was created in late 1994 by Judith Donath at the MIT Media Lab. It started slowly: 10-20 cards a day were sent in the first weeks, 1000-2000 a day over the first summer, and then it gained momentum rapidly. During the 1995-96 Christmas season, there were days when over 19,000 cards were sent; by late spring of 1996 over 1.7 million cards had been sent in total. The source code for this service was made publicly available, with the stipulation that users share improvements with each other. The Electric Postcard won numerous awards, including a 1995 GNN Best of the Net award.

By mid-1996, a number of sites had developed E-cards. By mid-October 1996, directly emailable greeting cards and postcards ("Email Express") were developed and introduced by Awesome Cards, based on new capabilities introduced in the Netscape 3.0 browser. This is the first time the E-card itself could be emailed directly by the card sender to the recipient rather than having an announcement sent with a link to the card's location at the E-card site.

In 2001, Hallmark artists Bob Holt and Mike Adair created Hoops & Yoyo, one of the first recurring e-card characters.

== See also ==
- Cardmaking
- E-mail
- Greeting cards
