= WinDirStat =

Graphical disk usage analyzer for Microsoft Windows

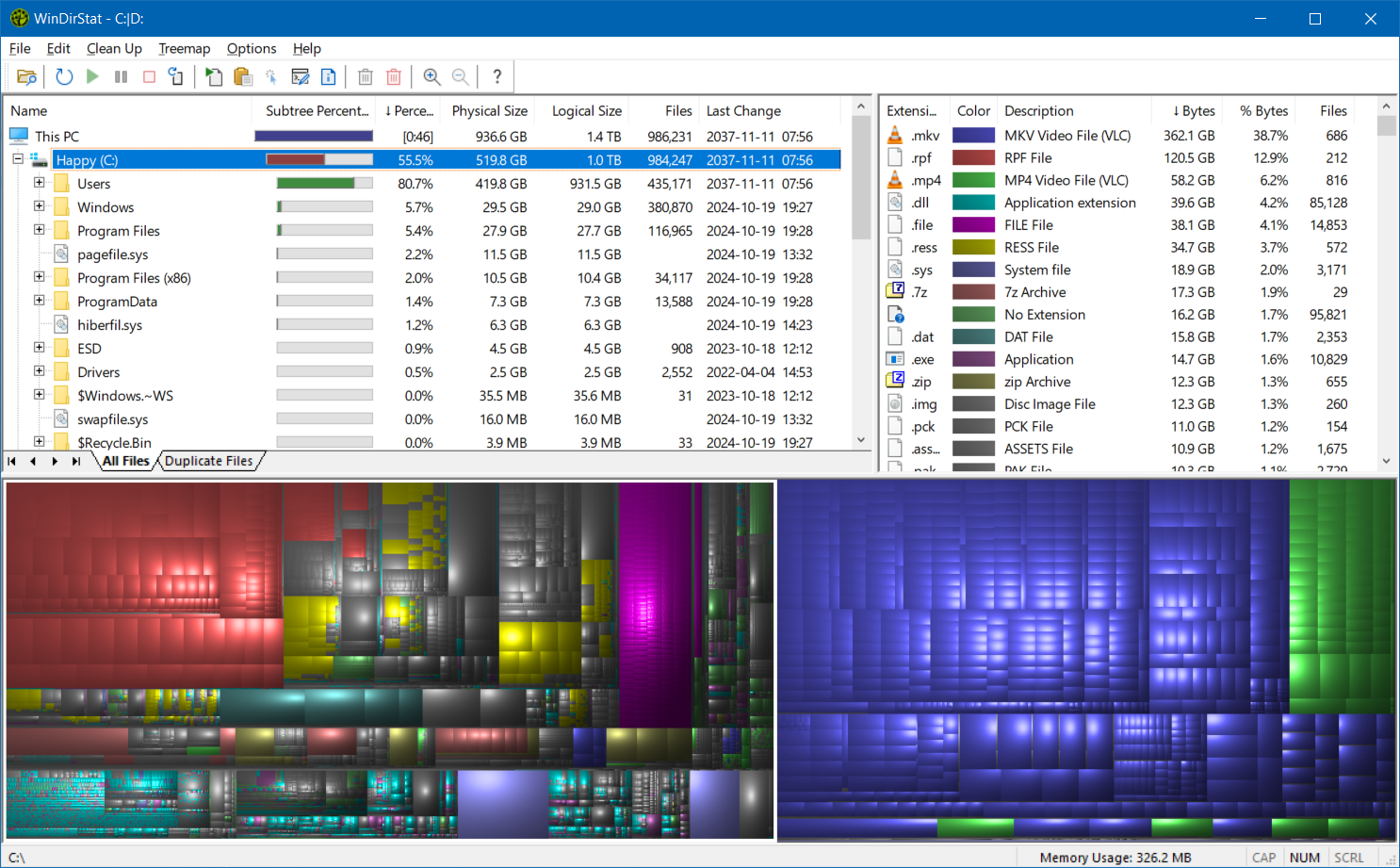
- WinDirStat displaying a directory tree, file-type statistics, and a treemap
- Developers: Bryan Berns, Bernhard Seifert, Oliver Schneider, and contributors
- Release: 1 October 2003; 23 years ago
- Stable release: 2.9.3 / 11 October 2026; 2 days ago
- Written in: C++
- Operating system: Microsoft Windows
- Platform: IA-32, x86-64, ARM64
- Size: 2.49 MB (2.37 MiB; x64 MSI installer, version 2.9.3)
- Type: Disk space analyzer
- License: GPLv3 or later
- Website: windirstat.net
- Repository: github.com/windirstat/windirstat

WinDirStat (Windows Directory Statistics) is a free and open-source disk space analyzer and cleanup utility for Microsoft Windows. It displays storage use through a directory tree, statistics grouped by file extension, and graphical visualizations. Its treemap represents files as colored rectangles whose areas are proportional to their sizes, allowing users to locate large files and directories.

The program also includes duplicate-file detection, permissions analysis, storage-cost estimates, reporting, and deleted-file recovery.

== History ==
WinDirStat was created by Bernhard Seifert after he encountered KDirStat in 2003. He adopted its combination of a directory listing and a treemap for a Windows application. The first version was released in October 2003. The project's account of its origins also discusses SequoiaView and the research underlying squarified and cushion-shaded treemaps. Oliver Schneider and Bryan Berns subsequently took on responsibility for the project.

After a long interval between releases, version 2.0.1 was announced in October 2024. In the announcement, Berns described joining the project approximately a year earlier to work with Schneider on an updated release.

=== Selected release milestones ===
The following table summarizes major releases and groups related maintenance updates.

Version	Release period	Main changes
1.0.0	October 2003	Initial release.
1.1.x	2004–2007	Maintenance releases and additional translations, including a revised installer in 2007.
2.0.1	October 2024	Multithreaded scanning, duplicate-file detection, native x64 and ARM64 builds, and expanded cleanup tools.
2.5–2.6	2026	Direct NTFS scanning, dark mode, expanded reporting, and Microsoft Store packaging.
2.7.0	July 2026	Permissions scanning and storage-cost analysis.
2.8.0	August 2026	Sunburst and flame-graph views, plus additional treemap layouts.
2.9.x	September–October 2026	MTP-device scanning, deleted-file recovery, and a native Win32/GDI interface. Version 2.9.2 changed the application license to GPLv3 or later; 2.9.3 included scanning and memory-use improvements.

== Features ==
WinDirStat links its directory listing, file-extension statistics, and graphical views so that selecting an item in one view identifies it in the others. Files can be grouped visually by directory and colored by file type. In addition to treemaps, the program provides sunburst and flame-graph views, configurable layouts, and a dark mode.

The program scans local drives, individual folders, network shares, and connected Media Transfer Protocol devices. It distinguishes logical file size from allocated disk space. For complete local NTFS volumes, an accelerated scanner can read the Master File Table directly; this mode requires administrator privileges and is not used for ordinary folder-only scans. Search and filtering support filenames, sizes, ownership, file types, and regular expressions. Duplicate-file detection uses configurable content hashes; optional sampling identifies probable rather than confirmed duplicates.

Permissions analysis displays accessible entries from file and folder access-control lists, rather than calculating a user's effective access. Storage analysis groups files by modification age and estimates the cost of user-defined storage tiers. These estimates use configurable prices and do not themselves move data between tiers.

Scan results can be saved and reopened, while CSV and JSON reports can be generated interactively or through command-line options. A file-system watcher tracks changes after a scan. Cleanup functions include file deletion and movement, NTFS compression, hardlink-based deduplication, and user-defined commands.

A separate recovery tool searches local NTFS, exFAT, and FAT12, FAT16, and FAT32 volumes for deleted files. Recovery requires administrator access and depends on surviving metadata and file contents; overwritten data, SSD TRIM, and file-system limitations can prevent successful recovery.

== Distribution and compatibility ==
WinDirStat is distributed through the Microsoft Store, which manages installation and updates, and through GitHub as MSI installers and portable ZIP or 7z archives. Native builds are provided for x86, x64, and ARM64. The project also documents installation through Windows Package Manager, Chocolatey, and Scoop.

For version 2.9.3, the project lists compatibility with Windows 7, 8, 8.1, 10, and 11, and Windows Server releases from 2008 R2 through 2025.

== Reception and usage ==
In October 2006, the German computer magazine c't featured WinDirStat in issue 21/2006 and included it on the accompanying CD.

In a review published by PCWorld in July 2011, Steve Bass praised the treemap for identifying large files and described the linked directory and graphical views, along with the program's navigation and deletion tools.

In November 2017, SourceForge included WinDirStat among its five leading systems-administration projects based on weekly downloads.

In July 2020, PCWorld writer Mark Hachman recommended WinDirStat for examining storage use beyond the information available in Windows' built-in storage settings, while describing its interface as "powerful, though intimidating". The following month, the publication's Brad Chacos reported using it to identify obsolete game installations and downloaded graphics-driver installers, allowing him to remove more than 100 GB of unwanted files.

In January 2021, Jacob Ridley of PC Gamer recommended WinDirStat for finding large game installations and accumulated videos and downloads. The article reported more than 19,000 downloads per week on SourceForge at that time.

As of 13 October 2026, the FossHub listing displayed more than 13.6 million downloads for WinDirStat.
