= Theory of Visualization =

Theory is becoming an important topic in visualization, expanding from its traditional origins in low-level perception and statistics to an ever-broader array of fields and subfields. It includes color theory, visual cognition, visual grammars, interaction theory, visual analytics and information theory.
