= Judith Donath =

American computer scientist

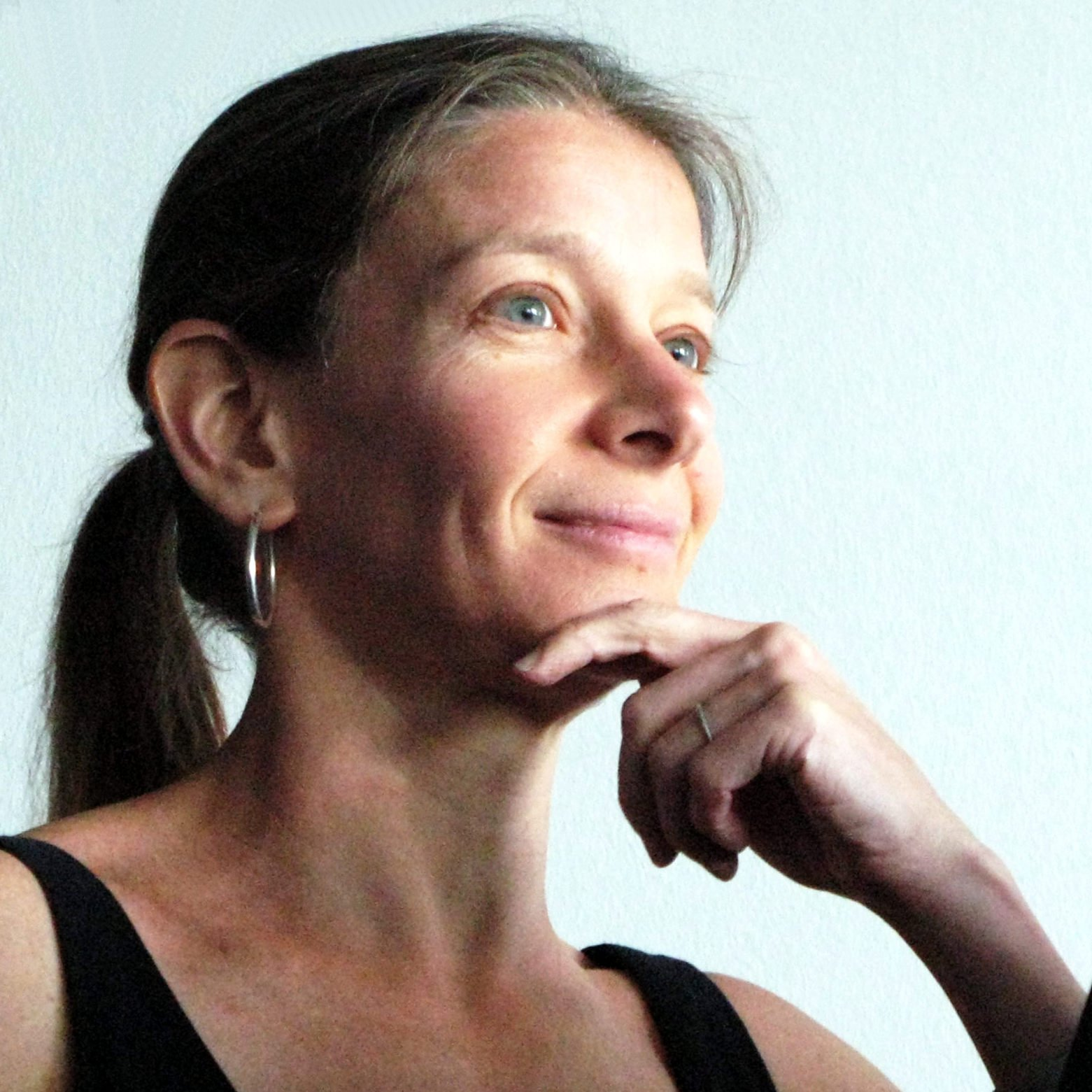
- Judith Donath giving a talk at the EPFL, on June 22, 2009
- Born: May 7, 1962 (age 64)
- Education: MIT; Yale University
- Known for: Educational software designer and builder, Social media research, Virtual world architect
- Scientific career
- Fields: Media Arts, Human–computer interaction, History
- Workplaces: MIT
- Thesis: Inhabiting the virtual city: The design of social environments for electronic communities (1997)
- Doctoral advisor: Andrew B. Lippman
- Doctoral students: Karrie Karahalios; Fernanda Viégas

Judith Stefania Donath (born May 7, 1962) is an American computer scientist who is a fellow at Harvard's Berkman Center, and the founder of the Sociable Media Group at the MIT Media Lab. She has written papers on various aspects of the Internet and its social impact, such as Internet society and community, interfaces, virtual identity issues, and other forms of collaboration that have become manifest with the advent of connected computing.

Her research work includes issues centered on "identity and deception in online communities" and the creation of multiple virtual personae. In 1999 she researched the presence of deception in the online identities of Usenet users, as well as the reconstruction of the personality of an individual using data gathered from both online and offline encounters.

== Career ==
Donath obtained her bachelor's degree in history from Yale and her master's and Ph.D. degrees in media arts and sciences from MIT. Her work includes the design and development of educational software and experimental media.

On October 10, 1995, while still a Ph.D. candidate at MIT, she helped organize a celebration of the tenth anniversary of the MIT Media Lab by conceiving a mass online collaboration project which featured the construction of a large website by worldwide contributors. The event was named A Day in the Life of Cyberspace and is an early example of mass collaboration on the Internet.

Her pioneering work includes the first postcard service, named The Electric Postcard, and the first interactive art show, titled Portraits in Cyberspace.

Her recent work includes directing the exhibit Id/Entity which includes collaborative works on the subject of the transformation of portraiture through the use of modern computer technology.

In her 2000 book Being Real, Donath explores the problems of cognition arising from the online behavioral dynamics of the interaction between human and possibly automated avatars in a virtual world.

She has investigated the effect of online social media on society as regards the public display of the social interconnections between the members of the online communities as a sort of "Public Displays of Connection". Her work on sociable media has applications in the field of semiotics. Donath has also explored the implications of deepfakes and synthetic media and the need to rely less upon them.

On the subject of telerobotics, Donath argues that the remote manipulation afforded by the discipline may act as a desensitizing agent because the identity and human characteristics of the remote subjects of the telerobotic operation remain unseen by the human teleoperator of the robot. She has also researched the ethnography of online communities.

Her work includes the application of architectural principles to the design of the social interaction environment of online communities in a kind of virtual city.

She has investigated best practices for online communication and their relation to issues of embodiment, gender, sexuality and identity.

Donath has explored the use of artificial emotions in avatars and their potential use in online advertising. She predicts that artificial avatars will possess "suites of emotions" comparable to an emotional wardrobe, from which they can pick the emotion they need to "wear", depending on the circumstances. That way they can be used in advertising campaigns to target their intended audience more effectively.

In her essay "Mediated Faces" she analyzes the role of facial representation and interpretation in an online communication environment, suggesting that there are wider possibilities for online facial representation through the use of computer-enhanced environments than a simple linear pictorial representation of the human face.

She has compared the anonymity of online flaming to the anonymity of vandalizing in real life.

Donath spoke on identity, anonymity, and the wiki at the August 2006 Wikimania conference. She returned as Fellow of Berkman Center for Internet & Society at Harvard University.

== Publications (A selection) ==
- Donath, Judith: Identity and Deception in the Virtual Community. In M. Smith and P. Kollock (eds.) Communities in Cyberspace. London: Routledge, 1998
- Fernanda Viégas, Judith Donath: Chat Circles. ACM Conference on Computer-Human Interaction (CHI), 1999
- Judith Donath, Karrie Karahalios, Fernanda Viégas: Persistent Conversations. Journal of Computer Mediated Communication 4 (4), 1999
- Donath, Judith: Being Real. In (K. Goldberg, ed.) The Robot in the Garden: Telerobotics and Telepistemology in the Age of the Internet. Cambridge, MA: MIT Press, 2000
- Donath, Judith: 1964 Ford Falcon. In (Turkle, S., Ed) Evocative Objects: Things We Think With. Cambridge, MA: MIT Press, 2007
- The Social Machine: Designs for Living Online (The MIT Press), 2014, ISBN 978-0262027014
