= Filelight =

Graphical disk usage analyzer software for KDE

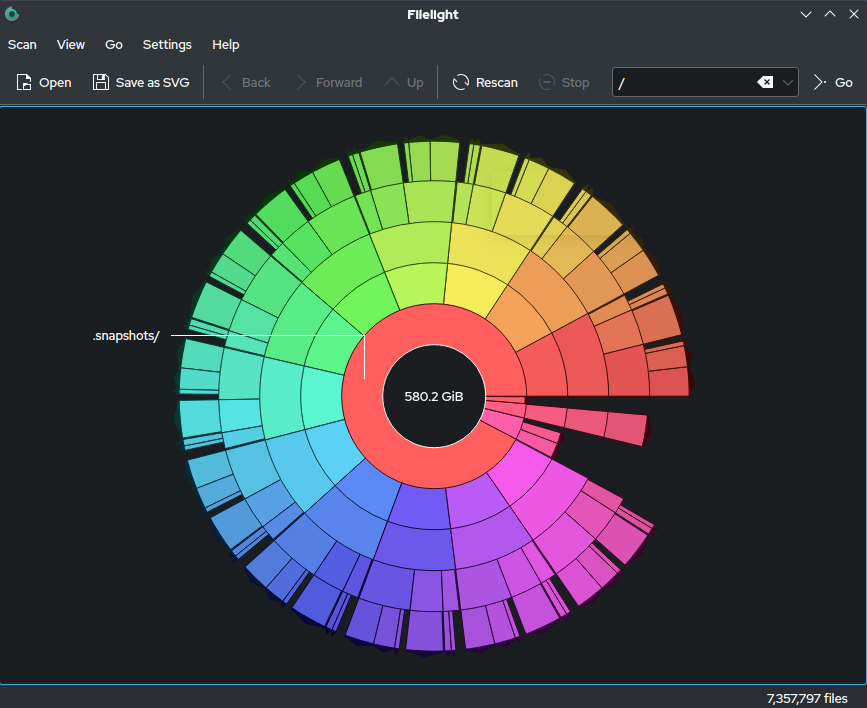
- Filelight screenshot
- Developers: Max Howell, Martin Sandsmark, et al.
- Initial release: January 12, 2004
- Stable release: 25.08.2 / 30 September 2025; 5 months ago
- Written in: C++ (Qt)
- Operating system: Linux/Unix/BSD/Windows
- Type: Disk space analyzer
- License: GPL-2.0-only or GPL-3.0-only
- Website: https://apps.kde.org/filelight/
- Repository: https://invent.kde.org/utilities/filelight

Filelight is a free graphical disk usage analyzer part of the KDE Gear set of applications. It shows directories that take up lots of space on the user's computer, and lets the user delete them. The app supports Windows and Unix-like systems and is open source.

== Overview ==
Instead of showing a tree view of the files within a partition or directory, or even a columns-represent-directories view like xdiskusage, it shows a series of concentric pie charts representing the various directories within the requested partition or directory and the amount of space they use. This method is known as a multilevel pie chart, sunburst chart or ring chart. Users may also on the pie-chart segment representing a particular directory and repeat the analysis for that directory, right click that segment to open a file manager or terminal emulator in that location, or copy to clipboard or delete the directory, and right click the segment representing a file to open it, copy it to the clipboard, or delete it.
