= Karrie Karahalios =

American computer scientist

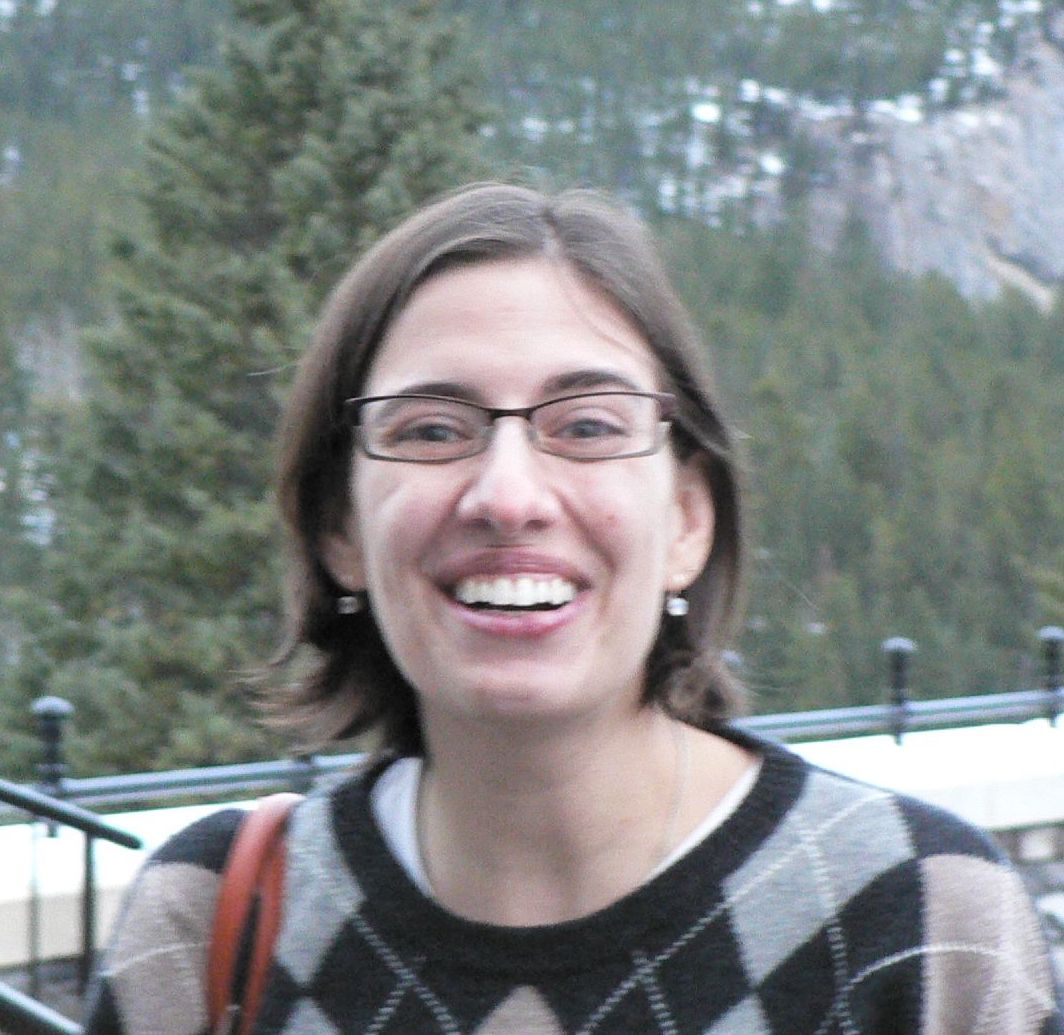
- Karrie Karahalios in Banff, 2006
- Born: Kyratso G. Karahalsio
- Education: Massachusetts Institute of Technology (BS, MS, ME, PhD)
- Known for: algorithmic auditing social media human-computer interaction diagnostic tools for autism spectrum disorder
- Awards: Sloan Research Fellowship (2010)
- Scientific career
- Fields: Computer science
- Institutions: Massachusetts Institute of Technology
- Thesis: Social catalysts: embracing communication in mediated spaces (2004)
- Doctoral advisor: Judith Donath
- Doctoral students: Eric Gilbert
- Website: social.cs.uiuc.edu/people/kkarahal.html

Kyratso (Karrie) G. Karahalios is an American computer scientist and professor at the MIT Media Lab. She is noted for her work on the impact of computer science on people and society, analyses of social media, and algorithm auditing. Previously, she was a co-founder of the Center for People and Infrastructures at the University of Illinois at Urbana-Champaign.

== Education ==
She received her bachelor's degree and M.E. in electrical engineering and computer science in 1994 and 1995, respectively, and her M.S. in media arts and science in 1997 and Ph.D. in media arts and sciences in 2004, all from the Massachusetts Institute of Technology.

== Career and research ==
Karahalios joined the Department of Computer Science at the University of Illinois at Urbana-Champaign in 2004 as an assistant professor and received tenure in 2010. In 2017 she was promoted to full professor. Her research focuses on social media and the impact of computing on society, including algorithmic bias and methods to detect and analyze such bias, a field termed "algorithm auditing". Her 2014 paper on auditing algorithms provided research methods for detecting discrimination on internet platforms has been cited more than 200 times. Her most cited paper provides a model for predicting "tie strength" in social media, and has been cited more than 2000 times according to Google Scholar.

== ACLU suit ==
In 2016, the American Civil Liberties Union filed a suit on behalf of Karahalios and several other plaintiffs against Loretta Lynch, in her official capacity as Attorney General of the United States, challenging "the constitutionality of a provision of the Computer Fraud and Abuse Act (“CFAA”), 18 U.S.C. § 1030 et seq., a federal statute that prohibits and chills academics, researchers, and journalists from testing for discrimination on the internet". The federal government argued against the suit, but in April 2018, a federal judge ruled that it should be permitted to continue.

== Awards and honors ==
Karahalios was one of the recipients of the National Science Foundation CAREER Awards in 2007, of the A. Richard Newton Breakthrough Research Award in 2008, and of the Alfred P. Sloan Fellowships in 2010. She was named a University Scholar at the University of Illinois in 2019 and also elected an ACM Distinguished Member.

She has received Best Paper awards for publications in the Conference on Human Factors in Computing Systems (CHI) in 2008, 2009, 2015, and 2017.
