= Disk utility =

Type of software utility

A disk utility is a utility focused on the functionality of computer disks. A disk utility may support one or more of the following capabilities: disk partitioning, logical volume management, changing drive letters and other mount points, renaming volumes, disk checking, and disk formatting. Typically, an operating system (OS) includes a disk utility for basic operations, and often other utilities are available for an OS.

== Examples ==
=== Cleaner ===
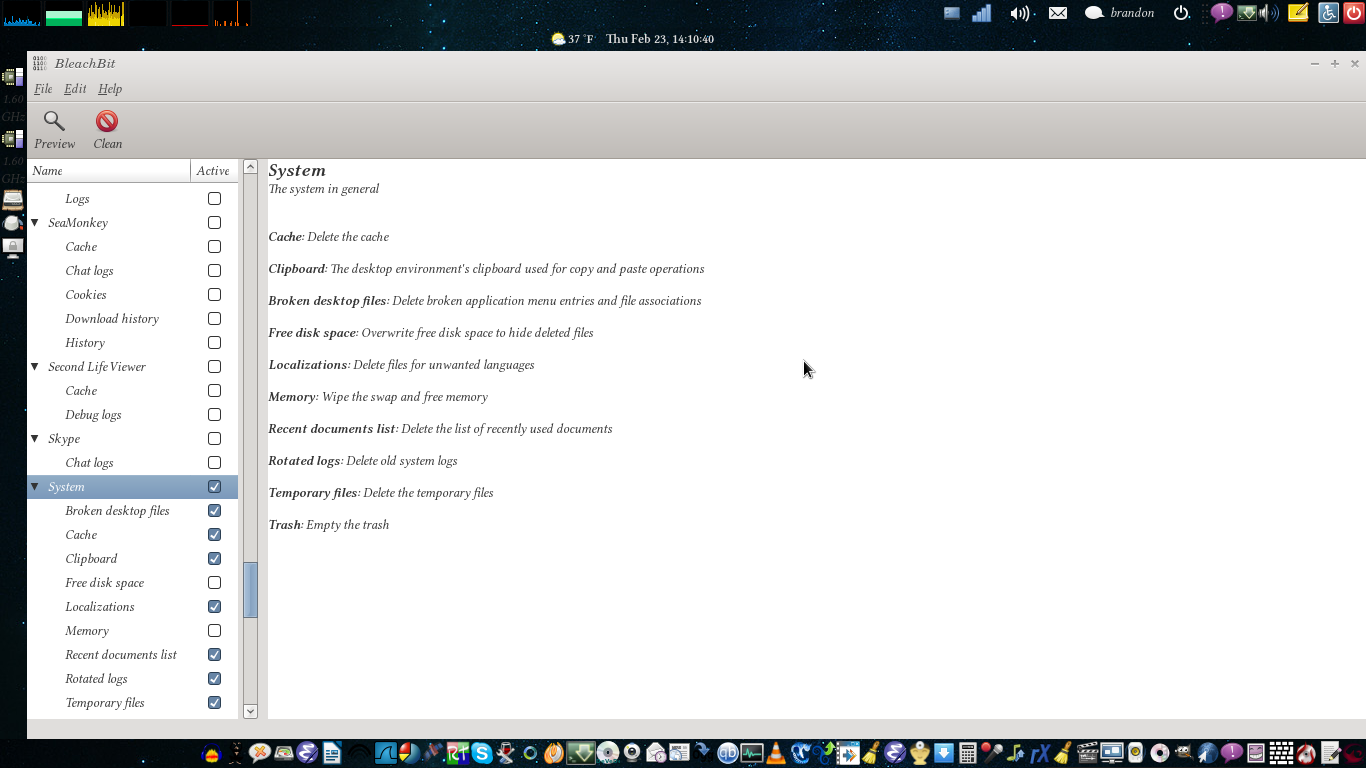
BleachBit, a disk cleaner

A disk cleaner deletes unnecessary or unwanted files to free up disk space, reduce clutter, or protect user privacy. Such files may include temporary files, trash, old backups, web caches, and privacy-related data such as HTTP cookies, local shared objects, and log files.

Disk cleaners are distinct from antivirus software (which deletes malware), a registry cleaner (which cleans the Windows Registry) or data erasure software (which securely deletes files).

=== Compression ===
Disk compression increases the amount of information that can be stored on a disk by automatically compressing and decompressing data as it is written to and read from it. A disk compression utility is software that provides disk compression by overriding the system's file access layer so that all programs participate in compression. When a program writes a file, the utility compresses the data before storage. When a program reads a file, the utility decompresses the stored data before providing it to the program.

Disk compression uses a single, normal file for storing the logical, user-visible files of a disk volume. This file tends to be relatively large and acts as a virtual drive. Typically, access to the compressed storage is via device driver. Similar utilities automatically compress and decompress each file instead of using a single, large file, but such a utility is not classified as disk compression.

Unlike a file compression utility which is generally interactive (user specifies which files to compress and when to compress them), a disk compression utility is noninteractive (files are processed automatically as part of normal file use). This automatic behavior is sometimes described as on-the-fly, transparent, real-time and online.

Disk compression was popular especially in the early 1990s, when microcomputer hard disks were relatively small (20 to 80 megabytes) and rather expensive (roughly 10 USD per megabyte). Such utilities tended to be a more economic means of having more disk space as opposed to buying a disk with more space. A good disk compression utility could, on average, double the available space with negligible speed loss. Disk compression fell into disuse by the late 1990s, as advances in hard drive technology and manufacturing led to lower cost per unit of space.

Examples:

- DriveSpace for Windows
- DiskDoubler for MacOS
- SquashFS for Linux

=== Checker ===
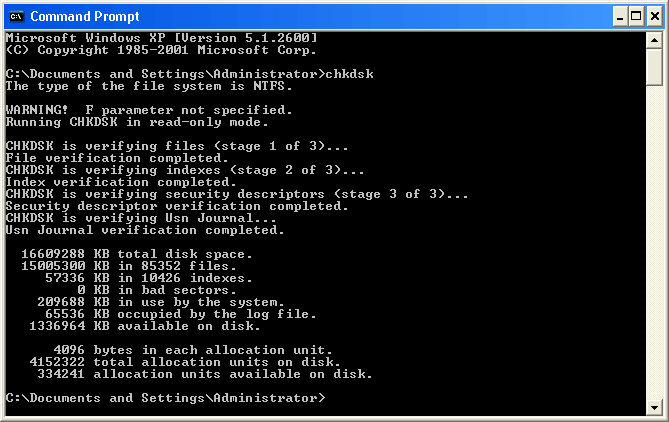
CHKDSK, a disk checker

A disk checker attempts to identify and correct invalid or corrupted disk areas and should not be confused with a disk cleaner, which deletes unnecessary files.

Some disk checkers can perform a whole surface scan to attempt to find any possible bad sectors, whereas others scan only the logical structure of files on the hard disk.

Operating systems often include one such tool. For example:

- CHKDSK
- fsck

=== Layout ===
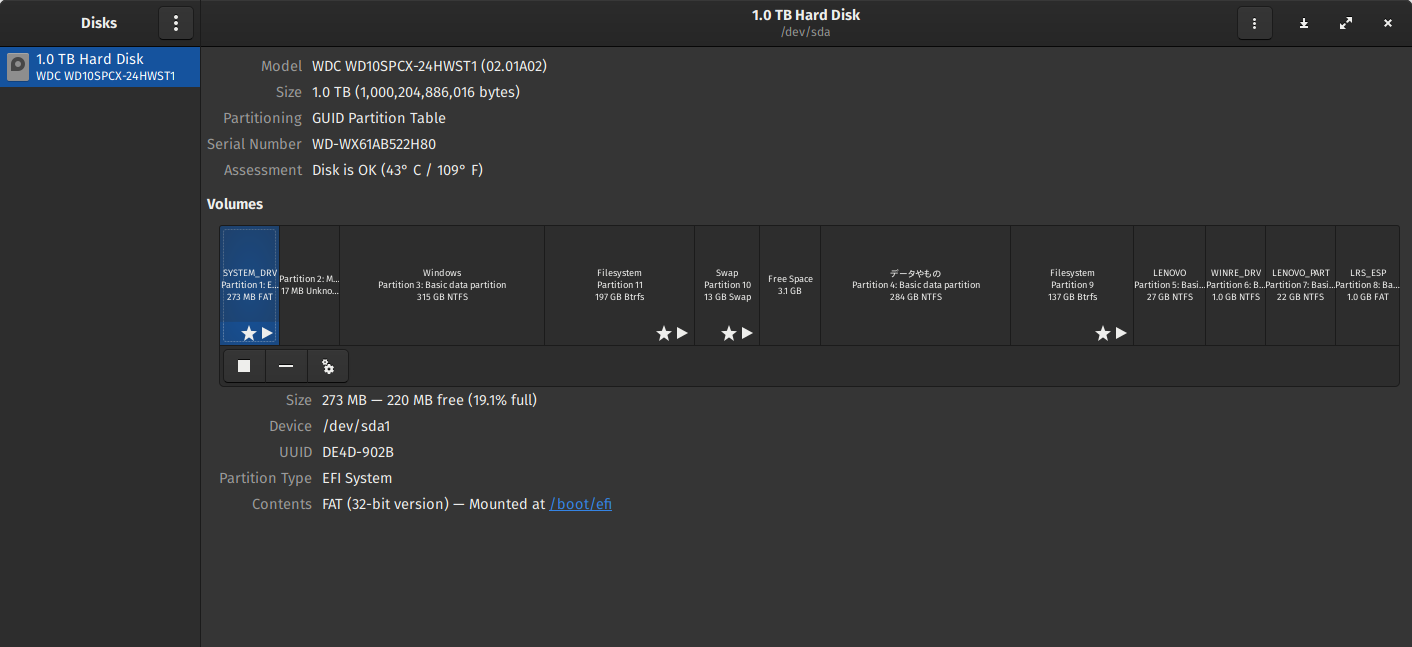
GNOME Disks 3.32 running on Arch Linux

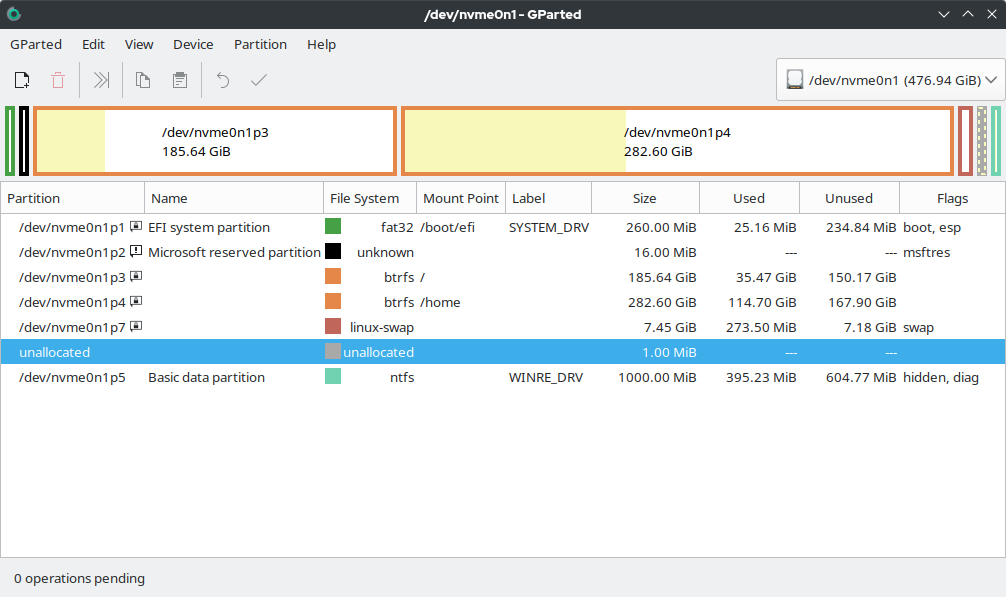
GParted, a front-end for GNU Parted

Disk formatting and disk partitioning tools generate low-level disk layouts and file systems. An operating system typically supplies one or more of such utilities.

Windows:

- Logical Disk Manager
- format
- fdisk
- diskpart

MacOS:

- Disk Utility

Linux:

- Logical Volume Manager
- GNOME Disks
- GNU Parted

=== Space analyzer ===
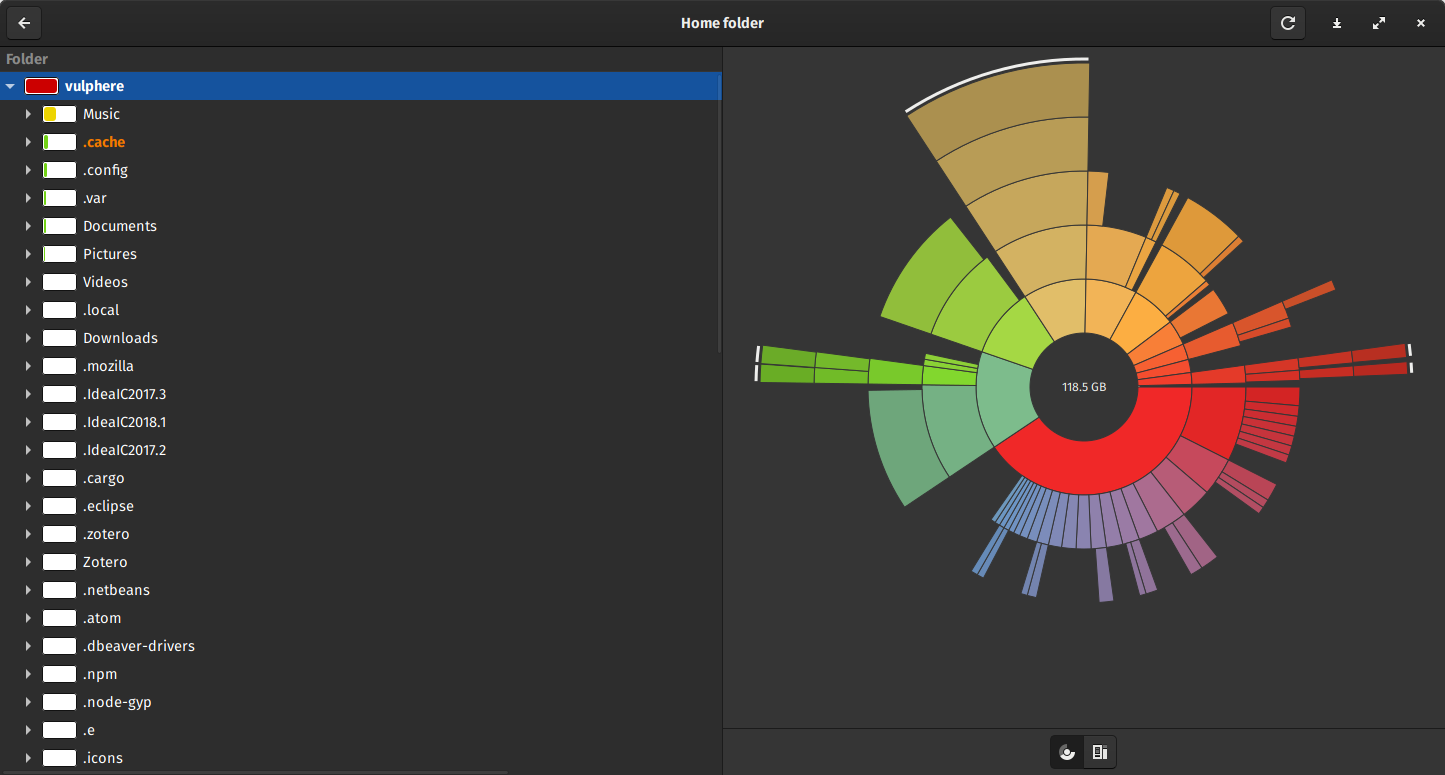
Disk Usage Analyzer, a disk space analyzer that uses sliced pie charts

A disk space analyzer (or disk usage analysis software) visualizes disk space usage by directories (including subdirectories) and files on a drive. Most such utilities generate graphical charts showing usage distribution by directory or other user-defined criteria.

Some disk space analyzers, such as DiskReport, also allow analysis of directory size and file count over time.

Examples:

- Directory Report
- WizTree
- DiskReport
- GNOME Disk Usage Analyzer
- KDE Filelight
- WinDirStat
- SpaceSniffer
- Disk Inventory X
- TreeSize
