= Comparison of file systems =

The following tables compare general and technical information for a number of computer file systems.

== General information ==
File system	Creator	Year of introduction	Original operating system
DECtape	DEC	1964	PDP-6 Monitor
OS/3x0 FS	IBM	1964	OS/360
Level-D	DEC	1968	TOPS-10
George 3	ICT (later ICL)	1968	George 3
Version 6 Unix file system (V6FS)	Bell Labs	1972	Version 6 Unix
RT-11 file system	DEC	1973	RT-11
Disk Operating System (GEC DOS)	GEC	1973	Core Operating System
CP/M file system	Digital Research (Gary Kildall)	1974	CP/M
Files-11 ODS-1	DEC	1975	RSX-11
GEC DOS filing system extended	GEC	1977	OS4000
FAT (8-bit)	Microsoft (Marc McDonald) for NCR	1977	Microsoft Standalone Disk BASIC-80 (later Microsoft Standalone Disk BASIC-86)
DOS 3.x	Apple	1978	Apple DOS
UCSD p-System	UCSD	1978	UCSD p-System
CBM DOS	Commodore	1978	Commodore BASIC
Atari DOS	Atari	1979	Atari 8-bit
Version 7 Unix file system (V7FS)	Bell Labs	1979	Version 7 Unix
Files-11 ODS-2	DEC	1979	OpenVMS
FAT12	Seattle Computer Products (Tim Paterson)	1980	QDOS/86-DOS (later IBM PC DOS 1.0)
ProDOS	Apple	1980	Apple SOS (later ProDOS 8)
DFS	Acorn Computers Ltd	1982	Acorn BBC Micro MOS
ADFS	Acorn Computers Ltd	1983	Acorn Electron (later Arthur/RISC OS)
FFS	Kirk McKusick	1983	4.2BSD
FAT16	IBM, Microsoft	1984	PC DOS 3.0, MS-DOS 3.0
MFS	Apple	1984	System 1
Elektronika BK tape format	NPO "Scientific centre" (now Sitronics)	1985	Vilnius Basic, BK monitor program
HFS	Apple	1985	System 2.1
Amiga OFS	Metacomco for Commodore	1985	Amiga OS
GEMDOS	Digital Research	1985	Atari TOS
NWFS	Novell	1985	NetWare 286
High Sierra	Ecma International	1986	MSCDEX for MS-DOS 3.1/3.2
FAT16B	Compaq	1987	Compaq MS-DOS 3.31
Minix V1 FS	Andrew S. Tanenbaum	1987	MINIX 1.0
Amiga FFS	Commodore	1988	Amiga OS 1.3
ISO 9660:1988	Ecma International, ISO	1988	MS-DOS, "classic" Mac OS, and AmigaOS
HPFS	IBM & Microsoft	1989	OS/2 1.2
ISO 9660: Rock Ridge extension	IEEE	c. 1990	Unix
JFS1	IBM	1990	AIX (Note: IBM introduced JFS with the initial release of AIX Version 3.1 in 1990. This file system now called JFS1. The new JFS, on which the Linux port was based, was first shipped in OS/2 Warp Server for e-Business in 1999. The same sourcebase was also used for release JFS2 on AIX 5L.)
VxFS	VERITAS	1991	SVR4.0
ext	Rémy Card	1992	Linux
AdvFS	DEC	1993	Digital Unix
NTFS	Microsoft (Gary Kimura, Tom Miller)	1993	Windows NT 3.1
LFS	Margo Seltzer	1993	Berkeley Sprite
ext2	Rémy Card	1993	Linux, Hurd
Xiafs	Q. Frank Xia	1993	Linux
UFS1	Kirk McKusick	1994	4.4BSD
XFS	SGI	1994	IRIX
HFS	IBM	1994	MVS/ESA (now z/OS)
FAT16X	Microsoft	1995	MS-DOS 7.0 / Windows 95
ISO 9660: Joliet extension	Microsoft	1995	Microsoft Windows, Linux, "classic" Mac OS, and FreeBSD
UDF	ISO/ECMA/OSTA	1995	—N/a
FAT32, FAT32X	Microsoft	1996	MS-DOS 7.1 / Windows 95 OSR2 (Note: Microsoft first introduced FAT32 in MS-DOS 7.1 / Windows 95 OSR2 (OEM Service Release 2) and then later in Windows 98. NT-based Windows did not have any support for FAT32 up to Windows NT4; Windows 2000 was the first NT-based Windows OS that received the ability to work with it.)
QFS	Sun Microsystems	1996	Solaris
GPFS	IBM	1996	AIX, Linux
Be File System	Be Inc. (D. Giampaolo, Cyril Meurillon)	1996	BeOS
Minix V2 FS	Andrew S. Tanenbaum	1997	MINIX 2.0
HFS Plus	Apple	1998	Mac OS 8.1
NSS	Novell	1998	NetWare 5
PolyServe File System (PSFS)	PolyServe	1998	Windows, Linux
Files-11 ODS-5	DEC	1998	OpenVMS V7.2
WAFL	NetApp	1998	Data ONTAP
ext3	Stephen Tweedie	1999	Linux
ISO 9660:1999	Ecma International, ISO	1999	Microsoft Windows, Linux, "classic" Mac OS, FreeBSD, and AmigaOS
JFS	IBM	1999	OS/2 Warp Server for e-business
GFS	Sistina (Red Hat)	2000	Linux
ReiserFS	Namesys	2001	Linux
zFS	IBM	2001	z/OS (backported to OS/390)
FATX	Microsoft	2002	Xbox
UFS2	Kirk McKusick	2002	FreeBSD 5.0
OCFS	Oracle Corporation	2002	Linux
SquashFS	Phillip Lougher, Robert Lougher	2002	Linux
VMFS2	VMware	2002	VMware ESX Server 2.0
Lustre	Cluster File Systems	2002	Linux
Fossil	Bell Labs	2003	Plan 9 version 4
Google File System	Google	2003	Linux
ZFS	Sun Microsystems	2004	Solaris
Reiser4	Namesys	2004	Linux
Non-Volatile File System	Palm, Inc.	2004	Palm OS Garnet
BeeGFS	Fraunhofer/ ThinkParQ	2005	Linux
GlusterFS	Gluster Inc.	2005	Linux
Minix V3 FS	Andrew S. Tanenbaum	2005	MINIX 3
OCFS2	Oracle Corporation	2005	Linux
NILFS	NTT	2005	Linux
VMFS3	VMware	2005	VMware ESX Server 3.0
GFS2	Red Hat	2006	Linux
ext4	various	2006	Linux
exFAT	Microsoft	2006	Windows CE 6.0
Btrfs	Chris Mason	2007	Linux
JXFS	Hyperion Entertainment	2008	AmigaOS 4.1
HAMMER	Matthew Dillon	2008	DragonFly BSD 2.0
LSFS	StarWind Software	2009	Linux, FreeBSD, Windows
UniFS	Nasuni	2009	Cloud
CASL	Nimble Storage	2010	Linux
OrangeFS	Omnibond and others	2011	Linux
VMFS5	VMware	2011	vSphere 5.0+
CHFS	University of Szeged	2011	NetBSD 6.0+
ReFS	Microsoft	2012	Windows Server 2012
F2FS	Samsung Electronics	2012	Linux
bcachefs	Kent Overstreet	2015	Linux
APFS	Apple	2016	macOS High Sierra, iOS 10.3
NOVA	University of California, San Diego	2017	Linux
BlueStore/CephFS	Red Hat, UC, Santa Cruz	2017	Linux
HAMMER2	Matthew Dillon	2017	DragonFly BSD 5.0
EROFS	Huawei	2018	Linux, Android
VaultFS	Swiss Vault	2022	Linux / Unix

== Metadata ==
File system	Stores file owner	POSIX file permissions	Creation timestamps	Last access/ read timestamps	Last metadata change timestamps	Last archive timestamps	Access control lists	Security/ MAC labels	Extended attributes/ Alternate data streams/ forks	Metadata checksum/ ECC
bcachefs	Yes	Yes	Yes	Yes	Yes	No	Yes	Yes	Yes	Yes
BeeGFS	Yes	Yes	No	Yes	Yes	No	Yes	?	Yes	Yes
CP/M file system	No	No	Yes (Note: Implemented in later versions as an extension)	No	No	No	No	No	No	No
DECtape	No	No	Yes	No	No	No	No	No	No	No
Elektronika BK tape format	No	No	No	No	No	No	No	No	No	Yes
Level-D	Yes	Yes	Yes	Yes (date only)	Yes	Yes	Yes (FILDAE)	No	No	No
RT-11	No	No	Yes (date only)	No	No	No	No	No	No	Yes
Version 6 Unix file system (V6FS)	Yes	Yes	No	Yes	No	No	No	No	No	No
Version 7 Unix file system (V7FS)	Yes	Yes	No	Yes	No	No	No	No	No	No
exFAT	No	No	Yes	Yes	No	No	No	No	No	No
FAT12/FAT16/FAT32	No	No	Yes	Yes	No (Note: Some FAT implementations, such as in Linux, show file modification timestamp (mtime) in the metadata change timestamp (ctime) field. This timestamp is however, not updated on file metadata change.)	No	No	No	No (Note: Particular Installable File System drivers and operating systems may not support extended attributes on FAT12 and FAT16. The OS/2 and Windows NT filesystem drivers for FAT12 and FAT16 support extended attributes (using a "EA DATA. SF" pseudo-file to reserve the clusters allocated to them). Other filesystem drivers for other operating systems do not.)	No
HPFS	Yes (Note: The f-node contains a field for a user identifier. This is not used except by OS/2 Warp Server, however.)	No	Yes	Yes	No	No	No	?	Yes	No
NTFS	Yes	Yes (Note: NTFS access control lists can express any access policy possible using simple POSIX file permissions (and far more), but use of a POSIX-like interface is not supported without an add-on such as Services for UNIX or Cygwin.)	Yes	Yes	Yes	No	Yes	Yes (Note: As of Vista, NTFS has support for Mandatory Labels, which are used to enforce Mandatory Integrity Control.)	Yes	No
ReFS	Yes	Yes	Yes	Yes	Yes	No	Yes	?	Yes (Note: Initially, ReFS lacked support for ADS, but Server 2012 R2 and up add support for ADS on ReFS)	Yes
HFS	No	No	Yes	No	No	Yes	No	No	Yes	No
HFS Plus	Yes	Yes	Yes	Yes	Yes	Yes	Yes	?	Yes	No
FFS	Yes	Yes	No	Yes	Yes	No	No	No	No	No
UFS1	Yes	Yes	No	Yes	Yes	No	Yes (Note: Access-control lists and MAC labels are layered on top of extended attributes.)	Yes	No (Note: Some operating systems implemented extended attributes as a layer over UFS1 with a parallel backing file (e.g., FreeBSD 4.x).)	No
UFS2	Yes	Yes	Yes	Yes	Yes	No	Yes	Yes	Yes	Partial
HAMMER	Yes	Yes	Yes	Yes	Yes	?	Yes	Yes	No	Yes
HAMMER2	Yes	Yes	?	?	?	?	?	?	?	?
LFS	Yes	Yes	No	Yes	Yes	No	No	No	No	No
EROFS	Yes	Yes	No	No	Yes	No	Yes	Yes	Yes	No
ext	Yes	Yes	No	No	No	No	No	No	No	No
Xiafs	Yes	Yes	No	Yes	Yes	No	No	No	No	No
ext2	Yes	Yes	No	Yes	Yes	No	Yes (Note: Some Installable File System drivers and operating systems may not support extended attributes, access control lists or security labels on these filesystems. Linux kernels prior to 2.6.x may either be missing support for these altogether or require a patch.)	Yes	Yes	No
ext3	Yes	Yes	No	Yes	Yes	No	Yes	Yes	Yes	No
ext4	Yes	Yes	Yes	Yes	Yes	No	Yes	Yes	Yes	Partial (Note: Metadata is mostly checksummed, however Direct/indirect/triple-indirect block maps are not protected by checksums)
NOVA	Yes	Yes	Yes	Yes	Yes	No	No	No	No	Yes
Lustre	Yes	Yes	No	Yes	Yes	No	Yes	Yes	Yes	No
F2FS	Yes	Yes	Yes	Yes	Yes	No	Yes	Yes	Yes	No
GPFS	Yes	Yes	Yes	Yes	Yes	No	Yes	Yes	Yes	Yes
GFS	Yes	Yes	No	Yes	Yes	No	Yes	Yes	Yes	No
NILFS	Yes	Yes	Yes	No	Yes	No	No	No	No	Yes
ReiserFS	Yes	Yes	No	Yes	Yes	No	Yes	Yes	Yes	No
Reiser4	Yes	Yes	No	Yes	Yes	No	No	No	No	No
OCFS	No	Yes	No	No	Yes	Yes	No	No	No	No
OCFS2	Yes	Yes	No	Yes	Yes	No	No	No	No	No
XFS	Yes	Yes	Yes (Note: Creation time stored since June 2015, xfsprogs version 3.2.3)	Yes	Yes	No	Yes	Yes	Yes	Yes
JFS	Yes	Yes	Yes	Yes	Yes	No	Yes	Yes	Yes	No
QFS	Yes	Yes	Yes	Yes	Yes	Yes	Yes	No	Yes	No
BFS	Yes	Yes	Yes	No	No	No	No	No	Yes	No
AdvFS	Yes	Yes	No	Yes	Yes	No	Yes	No	Yes	No
NSS	Yes	Yes	Yes (Note: The local time, time zone/UTC offset, and date are derived from the time settings of the reference/single timesync source in the NDS tree.)	Yes	Yes	Yes	Yes	?	Yes (Note: Novell calls this feature "multiple data streams". Published specifications say that NWFS allows for 16 attributes and 10 data streams, and NSS allows for unlimited quantities of both.) (Note: Some file and directory metadata is stored on the NetWare server irrespective of whether Directory Services is installed or not, like date/time of creation, file size, purge status, etc; and some file and directory metadata is stored in NDS/eDirectory, like file/object permissions, ownership, etc.)	No
NWFS	Yes	?	Yes	Yes	Yes	Yes	Yes	?	Yes	No
Files-11 ODS-1	Yes	Yes	Yes	No	No	No	No	No	Yes (Note: Record Management Services (RMS) attributes include record type and size, among many others.)	No
Files-11 ODS-2	Yes	Yes	Yes	No	No	Yes	Yes	?	Yes	No
Files-11 ODS-5	Yes	Yes	Yes	Yes	Yes	Yes	Yes	?	Yes	No
APFS	Yes	Yes	Yes	Yes	Yes	Yes	Yes	Yes	Yes	Yes
VxFS	Yes	Yes	Yes	Yes	Yes	No	Yes	?	Yes	No
UDF	Yes	Yes	Yes	Yes	Yes	Yes	Yes	No	Yes	Yes
Fossil	Yes	Yes (Note: File permission in 9P are a variation of the traditional Unix permissions with some minor changes, e.g. the suid bit is replaced by a new 'exclusive access' bit.)	No	Yes	Yes	No	No	No	No	No
ZFS	Yes	Yes	Yes	Yes	Yes	Yes	Yes	Yes (Note: Supported on FreeBSD and Linux implementations, support may not be available on all operating systems.)	Yes (Note: Solaris "extended attributes" are really full-blown alternate data streams, in both the Solaris UFS and ZFS.)	Yes
Btrfs	Yes	Yes	Yes	Yes	Yes	No	Yes	Yes	Yes	Yes
Minix V1	Yes	Yes	No	No	No	No	No	No	No	No
Minix V2	Yes	Yes	No	Yes	Yes	No	No	No	No	No
Minix V3	Yes	Yes	No	Yes	Yes	No	No	No	No	No
VMFS2	Yes	Yes	No	Yes	Yes	No	No	No	No	No
VMFS3	Yes	Yes	No	Yes	Yes	No	No	No	No	No
ISO 9660:1988	No	No	Yes	No	No	No	No	No	No	No
ISO 9660: Rock Ridge extension	Yes	Yes	No	Yes (Note: Access times are preserved from the original file system at creation time, but Rock Ridge file systems themselves are read-only.)	Yes	No	No (Note: libburnia can back up and restore ACLs with file system creation and extraction programs, but no kernel support exists.)	No (Note: libburnia can back up and restore extended attributes and MAC labels with file system creation and extraction programs, but no kernel support exists.)	No	No
ISO 9660: Joliet extension	No	No	Yes	No	No	No	No	No	No	No
ISO 9660:1999	No	No	Yes	No	No	No	No	No	No	No
High Sierra	No	No	Yes	No	No	No	No	No	No	No
SquashFS	Yes	Yes	No	No	Yes	No	No	Yes	Yes	No
BlueStore/CephFS	Yes	Yes	Yes	Yes	?	No	Yes	Yes	Yes	Yes
File system	Stores file owner	POSIX file permissions	Creation timestamps	Last access/ read timestamps	Last metadata change timestamps	Last archive timestamps	Access control lists	Security/ MAC labels	Extended attributes/ Alternate data streams/ forks	Metadata checksum/ ECC

All widely used file systems record a last modified time stamp (also known as "mtime"). It is not included in the table.

Individual file systems may record additional special types of date and time stamps. For example, the specification of ISO 9660 includes a "File Expiration Date and Time" and a "File Effective Date and Time".

== Features ==
=== File capabilities ===
File system	Hard links	Symbolic links	Block journaling	Metadata-only journaling	Case-sensitive	Case-preserving	File Change Log	XIP
DECtape	No	No	No	No	No	No	No	No
BeeGFS	No	Yes	Yes	Yes	Yes	Yes	No	No
Level-D	No	No	No	No	No	No	No	No
RT-11	No	No	No	No	No	No	No	No
APFS	Yes	Yes	?	?	Optional (Note: There are two variants of APFS, one that is case-sensitive, and one that is not. The non-case-sensitive variant is the default one in macOS 10.13+, while the case-sensitive variant is the default one for iOS 10.3+.)	Yes	?	?
Version 6 Unix file system (V6FS)	Yes	No	No	No	Yes	Yes	No	No
Version 7 Unix file system (V7FS)	Yes	No (Note: System V Release 4, and some other Unix systems, retrofitted symbolic links to their versions of the Version 7 Unix file system, although the original version didn't support them.)	No	No	Yes	Yes	No	No
exFAT	No	No	No	Partial (with TexFAT only)	No	Yes	No	No
FAT12	No	No	No	Partial (with TFAT12 only)	No	Partial (with VFAT LFNs only)	No	No
FAT16 / FAT16B / FAT16X	No	No	No	Partial (with TFAT16 only)	No	Partial (with VFAT LFNs only)	No	No
FAT32 / FAT32X	No	No	No?	Partial (with TFAT32 only)	No	Partial (with VFAT LFNs only)	No	No
GFS	Yes	Yes (Note: Context based symlinks were supported in GFS, GFS2 only supports standard symlinks since the bind mount feature of the Linux VFS has made context based symlinks obsolete)	Yes	Yes (Note: Optional journaling of data)	Yes	Yes	No	No
HPFS	No	No	No	No	No	Yes	No	No
NTFS	Yes	Yes (Note: As of Windows Vista, NTFS fully supports symbolic links. NTFS 3.0 (Windows 2000) and higher can create junctions, which allow entire directories (but not individual files) to be mapped to elsewhere in the directory tree of the same partition (file system). These are implemented through reparse points, which allow the normal process of filename resolution to be extended in a flexible manner.)	No (Note: NTFS stores everything, even the file data, as meta-data, so its log is closer to block journaling.)	Yes (2000)	Yes (Note: While NTFS itself supports case sensitivity, the Win32 environment subsystem cannot create files whose names differ only by case for compatibility reasons. When a file is opened for writing, if there is any existing file whose name is a case-insensitive match for the new file, the existing file is truncated and opened for writing instead of a new file with a different name being created. Other subsystems like e. g. Services for Unix, that operate directly above the kernel and not on top of Win32 can have case-sensitivity.)	Yes	Yes	?
HFS Plus	Yes	Yes	No	Yes (Note: Metadata-only journaling was introduced in the Mac OS X 10.2.2 HFS Plus driver; journaling is enabled by default on Mac OS X 10.3 and later.)	Optional (Note: Although often believed to be case sensitive, HFS Plus normally is not. The typical default installation is case-preserving only. From Mac OS X 10.3 on the command newfs_hfs -s will create a case-sensitive new file system. HFS Plus version 5 optionally supports case-sensitivity. However, since case-sensitivity is fundamentally different from case-insensitivity, a new signature was required so existing HFS Plus utilities would not see case-sensitivity as a file system error that needed to be corrected. Since the new signature is 'HX', it is often believed this is a new filesystem instead of a simply an upgraded version of HFS Plus.)	Yes	Yes (Note: Mac OS X Tiger (10.4) and late versions of Panther (10.3) provide file change logging (it's a feature of the file system software, not of the volume format, actually).)	No
FFS	Yes	Yes	No	No	Yes	Yes	No	No
UFS1	Yes	Yes	No	No	Yes	Yes	No	No
UFS2	Yes	Yes	No	Yes (Note: "Soft dependencies" (softdep) in NetBSD, called "soft updates" in FreeBSD provide meta-data consistency at all times without double writes (journaling)) (Note: Journaled Soft Updates (SU+J) are the default as of FreeBSD 9.x-RELEASE)	Yes	Yes	No	?
HAMMER	Yes	Yes	Yes	Yes	Yes	Yes	?	No
HAMMER2	Yes	Yes	?	?	?	?	?	?
LFS	Yes	Yes	Yes (Note: UDF, LFS, and NILFS are log-structured file systems and behave as if the entire file system were a journal.)	No	Yes	Yes	No	No
EROFS	Yes	Yes	No	No	Yes	Yes	No	No
ext	Yes	Yes	No	No	Yes	Yes	No	No
Xiafs	Yes	Yes	No	No	Yes	Yes	No	No
ext2	Yes	Yes	No	No	Yes	Yes	No	Yes (Note: Linux kernel versions 2.6.12 and newer.)
ext3	Yes	Yes	Yes (2001) (Note: Off by default.)	Yes (2001)	Yes	Yes	No	Yes
ext4	Yes	Yes	Yes	Yes	Yes, optional	Yes	No	Yes
NOVA	Yes	Yes	No	Yes	Yes	Yes	No	Yes
F2FS	Yes	Yes	Yes	No	Yes	Yes	No	No
Lustre	Yes	Yes	Yes	Yes	Yes	Yes	Yes	No
NILFS	Yes	Yes	Yes	No	Yes	Yes	No	No
ReiserFS	Yes	Yes	Yes (Note: Full block journaling for ReiserFS was added to Linux 2.6.8.)	Yes	Yes	Yes	No	?
Reiser4	Yes	Yes	Yes	No	Yes	Yes	No	?
OCFS	No	Yes	No	No	Yes	Yes	No	No
OCFS2	Yes	Yes	Yes	Yes	Yes	Yes	No	No
XFS	Yes	Yes	Yes	Yes	Yes (Note: Optionally no on IRIX and Linux.)	Yes	Yes	?
JFS	Yes	Yes	Yes	Yes (1990)	Yes (Note: Particular Installable File System drivers and operating systems may not support case sensitivity for JFS. OS/2 does not, and Linux has a mount option for disabling case sensitivity.)	Yes	No	?
QFS	Yes	Yes	No	Yes	Yes	Yes	No	No
BFS	Yes	Yes	No	Yes	Yes	Yes	?	No
NSS	Yes	Yes	?	Yes	Yes (Note: Case-sensitivity/Preservation depends on client. Windows, DOS, and OS/2 clients don't see/keep case differences, whereas clients accessing via NFS or AFP may.)	Yes	Yes (Note: The file change logs, last entry change timestamps, and other filesystem metadata, are all part of the extensive suite of auditing capabilities built into NDS/eDirectory called NSure Audit.)	No
NWFS	Yes (Note: Available only in the "NFS" namespace.)	Yes	No	No	Yes	Yes	Yes	No
Files-11 ODS-1	Yes	No	No	No	No	No	No	No
Files-11 ODS-2	Yes	Yes (Note: These are referred to as "aliases".)	No	Yes	No	No	Yes	No
Files-11 ODS-5	Yes	Yes	No	Yes	No	Yes	Yes	?
UDF	Yes	Yes	Yes	Yes	Yes	Yes	No	Yes
VxFS	Yes	Yes	Yes	No	Yes	Yes	Yes	?
Fossil	No	No	No	No	Yes	Yes	Yes	No
ZFS	Yes	Yes	Yes (Note: ZFS is a transactional filesystem using copy-on-write semantics, guaranteeing an always-consistent on-disk state without the use of a traditional journal. However, it does also implement an intent log to provide better performance when synchronous writes are requested.)	No	Yes	Yes	No	No
Btrfs	Yes	Yes	Yes (Note: Btrfs is a transactional filesystem using copy-on-write semantics, guaranteeing an always-consistent on-disk state without the use of a traditional journal. It keeps track of last five transactions and uses checksums to find problematic drives, making write intent logs unnecessary.)	No	Yes	Yes	?	?
bcachefs	Yes	Yes	Yes (Note: Bcachefs is a transactional filesystem using copy-on-write semantics, guaranteeing an always-consistent on-disk state without the use of a traditional journal. Journal commits are fairly expensive operations as they require issuing FLUSH and FUA operations to the underlying devices. By default, a journal flush is issued one second after a filesystem update has been done, which primarily records btree updates ordered by when they occurred. This option may be useful on a personal workstation or laptop, and perhaps less appropriate on a server.)	No	Yes, optional	Yes	?	?
Minix V1	Yes	Yes	No	No	Yes	Yes	No	No
Minix V2	Yes	Yes	No	No	Yes	Yes	No	No
Minix V3	Yes	Yes	No	No	Yes	Yes	No	No
VMFS2	Yes	Yes	No	Yes	Yes	Yes	No	No
VMFS3	Yes	Yes	No	Yes	Yes	Yes	No	No
ReFS	Yes (Note: Since Windows 10 Enterprise Insider Preview build 19536)	Yes	?	?	Yes	Yes	?	?
ISO 9660	No	No	No	No	No	No	No	No
ISO 9660: Rock Ridge extension	Yes	Yes	No	No	Yes	Yes	No	No
ISO 9660: Joliet extension	No	No	No	No	No	Yes	No	No
SquashFS	Yes	Yes	No	No	Yes	Yes	No	No
BlueStore/CephFS	Yes	Yes	Yes	Yes	Yes	Yes	No	No
File system	Hard links	Symbolic links	Block journaling	Metadata-only journaling	Case-sensitive	Case-preserving	File Change Log	XIP

=== Block capabilities ===
Note that in addition to the below table, block capabilities can be implemented below the file system layer in Linux (LVM, integritysetup, cryptsetup) or Windows (Volume Shadow Copy Service, SECURITY), etc.

File system	Internal snapshotting / branching	Encryption	Deduplication	Data checksum/ ECC	Persistent Cache	Multiple Devices	Compression	Self-healing (Note: A file system is self-healing if its capable to proactively autonomously detect and correct all but grave errors, faults and corruptions online both in internal metadata AND data. See US7694191B1 as example. This usually requires full checksumming as well as internal redundancy as well as corresponding logic.)
DECtape	No	No	No	No	No	No	No	No
BeeGFS	No	No	Yes	No	No	No	Yes	No
Level-D	No	No	No	No	No	No	No	No
RT-11	No	No	No	No	No	No	No	No
APFS	Yes	Yes	Yes	No	No	No	Yes	No
Version 6 Unix file system (V6FS)	No	No	No	No	No	No	No	No
Version 7 Unix file system (V7FS)	No	No	No	No	No	No	No	No
exFAT	No	No	No	No	No	No	No	No
FAT12	No	No	No	No	No	No	Partial (Note: only inside of Stacker 3/4 and DriveSpace 3 compressed volumes)	No
FAT16 / FAT16B / FAT16X	No	No	No	No	No	No	Partial	No
FAT32 / FAT32X	No	No	No	No	No	No	No	No
GFS	No	No	?	No	No	No	No	No
HPFS	?	No	?	No	No	No	No	No
NTFS	No	Yes	Yes (Note: Supported only on Windows Server SKUs. However, partitions deduplicated on Server can be used on Client.)	No	No	No	Yes	No
HFS Plus	No	No (Note: HFS+ does not actually encrypt files: to implement FileVault, OS X creates an HFS+ filesystem in a sparse, encrypted disk image that is automatically mounted over the home directory when the user logs in.)	No	No	No	No	No	No
FFS	No	No	No	No	No	No	No	No
UFS1	No	No	No	No	No	No	No	No
UFS2	Yes	No	No	No	No	No	No	No
HAMMER	Yes	No	Yes	Yes	No	No	No	No
HAMMER2	Yes	?	Yes	Yes	?	?	Yes	Pending
LFS	Yes	No	No	No	No	No	No	No
EROFS	No	No	Yes	No	No	Yes	Yes	No
ext	No	No	No	No	No	No	No	No
Xiafs	No	No	No	No	No	No	No	No
ext2	No	No	No	No	No	No	No	No
ext3	No	No	No	No	No	No	No	No
ext4	No	Yes, experimental	No	No	No	No	No	No
NOVA	Yes	No	No	Yes	No	No	No	?
F2FS	No	Yes, experimental	No	No	No	No	Yes	No
Lustre	No	No	No	No	Yes	Yes	No	No
NILFS	Yes, continuous	No	No	Yes	No	No	No	No
ReiserFS	No	No	No	No	No	No	No	No
Reiser4	?	Yes (Note: Reiser4 supports transparent compression and encryption with the cryptcompress plugin which is the default file handler in version 4.1.)	?	No	No	No	Yes	No
OCFS	No	No	No	No	No	No	No	No
OCFS2	No	No	No	No	No	No	No	No
XFS	No	No	Yes	No	No	No	No	No
JFS	?	No	?	No	No	No	only in JFS1 on AIX	No
QFS	No	No	No	No	No	No	No	No
BFS	No	No	No	No	No	No	No	No
NSS	Yes	Yes	?	No	No	No	Yes	No
NWFS	?	No	?	No	No	No	Yes	No
Files-11 ODS-2	Yes	No	No	No	No	No	No	No
Files-11 ODS-5	Yes	No	No	No	No	No	No	?
UDF	No	No	No	No	No	No	No	No
VxFS	Yes (Note: VxFS provides an optional feature called "Storage Checkpoints" which allows for advanced file system snapshots.)	No	Yes	No	No	No	No	No
Fossil	Yes	No	Yes	No	No	No	Yes	No
ZFS	Yes	Yes (Note: Applies to proprietary ZFS release 30 and ZFS On Linux. Encryption support is not yet available in all OpenZFS ports.)	Yes	Yes	Yes	Yes	Yes (Note: LZJB (optimized for performance while providing decent data compression) LZ4 (faster & higher ratio than lzjb) gzip levels: 1 (fastest) to 9 (best), default is 6 zstd positive: 1 (fastest) to 19 (best), default is 3 zstd negative: 1(best & default)-10, 20, 30, …, 100, 500, 1000(fastest) zle: compresses runs of zeros.)	Yes
Btrfs	Yes	No	Yes	Yes (Note: disabling copy-on-write (COW) to prevent fragmentation also disables data checksumming)	No	Yes	Yes (Note: zlib levels: 1 to 9, default is 3 LZO (no levels) faster than ZLIB, worse ratio zstd levels: -15 to 15, default is 3 (higher levels are not available and may not bring a significant improvement, lower levels are close to real time))	Yes
bcachefs	Yes	Yes	No	Yes (Note: none CRC-32C (default) crc64 xxHash (64-bit) chacha20/poly1305 (When encryption is enabled. Encryption can only be specified for the entire filesystem, not per file or directory))	Yes	Yes	Yes (Note: none (default) The three currently supported algorithms are gzip, LZ4, zstd. The compression level may also be optionally specified, as an integer between 0 and 15, e.g. lz4:15. 0 specifies the default compression level, 1 specifies the fastest and lowest compression ratio, and 15 the slowest and best compression ratio.)	Yes (Note: Work in progress)
Minix V1	No	No	No	No	No	No	No	No
Minix V2	No	No	No	No	No	No	No	No
Minix V3	No	No	No	No	No	No	No	No
VMFS2	No	No	No	No	No	No	No	No
VMFS3	No	No	No	No	No	No	No	No
ReFS	Yes (Note: 3.7: Added file-level snapshot (only available in Windows Server 2022).)	No	Yes	No (Note: By using the per-file "integrity stream" that internally stores a checksum per cluster. Those per cluster checksums are not accessible so it is actually a per file feature and not a per block feature. Integrity streams are not enabled by default.)	No	No	No (Note: 3.9: Added post process compression with LZ4 and ZSTD and transparent decompression.)	No
ISO 9660	No	No	No (Note: Some file system creation implementations reuse block references and support deduplication this way. This is not supported by the standard, but usually works well due to the file system's read-only nature.)	No	No	No	No	No
ISO 9660: Rock Ridge extension	No	No	No	No	No	No	No	No
ISO 9660: Joliet extension	No	No	No	No	No	No	No	No
SquashFS	No	No	Yes	Yes	No	No	Yes	No
BlueStore/CephFS	Yes	No	No	Yes	Yes	Yes	Yes	Yes
File system	Internal snapshotting / branching	Encryption	Deduplication	Data checksum/ ECC	Persistent Cache	Multiple Devices	Compression	Self-healing

=== Resize capabilities ===
"Online" and "offline" are synonymous with "mounted" and "not mounted".

File system	Host OS	Offline grow	Online grow	Offline shrink	Online shrink	Add and remove physical volumes
exFAT	misc.	No	No	No	No	No
FAT16 / FAT16B / FAT16X	misc.	Yes (Note: With software based on GNU Parted.)	No	Yes	No	No
FAT32 / FAT32X	misc.	Yes	No	Yes	No	No
NTFS	Windows	Yes	Yes	Yes	Yes	No
ReFS	Windows	?	Yes	?	No	No
HFS	macOS	No	No	No	No	No
HFS Plus	macOS	No	Yes	No	Yes	No
APFS	macOS	?	Yes	?	Yes	?
HAMMER	DragonflyBSD	?	?	?	?	?
EROFS	Linux	Yes	No	No	No	Yes
ext2	Linux	Yes	No	Yes	No	No
ext3	Linux	Yes	Yes	Yes	No	No
ext4	Linux	Yes	Yes	Yes	No	No
NOVA	Linux	No	No	No	No	No
F2FS	Linux	Yes	No	No	No	No
Lustre	Linux	?	Yes	No	No	Yes
XFS	Linux	No	Yes	No	No	No
JFS2	AIX	Yes	Yes	Yes	Yes	No
JFS	Linux	Yes	No	No	No	No
NTFS	Linux	Yes	No	Yes	No	No
ReiserFS	Linux	Yes	Yes	Yes	No	No
Reiser4	Linux	Yes	Yes	Yes	No	No
Btrfs	Linux	Yes	Yes	Yes	Yes	Yes
bcachefs	Linux	Yes	Yes	No	No	Yes
NILFS	Linux	No	Yes	No	Yes	No
ZFS	misc.	No	Yes	No	Yes	Partial
UFS2	FreeBSD	Yes	Yes (FreeBSD 10.0-RELEASE or later)	No	No	No
SquashFS	Linux	No	No	No	No	No
BlueStore/CephFS	Linux	No	Yes	No	Yes	Yes

=== Allocation and layout policies ===
File system	Sparse files	Block suballocation	Tail packing	Extents	Variable block size (Note: Variable block size refers to systems which support different block sizes on a per-file basis. This is similar to extents but a slightly different implementational choice.)	Inline data (resident files)	Allocate-on-flush	Copy on write	Trim support
DECtape	No	No	No	No	No	?	No	No	No
BeeGFS	Yes	No	No	Yes	Yes	?	Yes	Yes	?
Level-D	No	No	No	Yes	No	?	No	No	?
APFS	Yes	?	?	Yes	?	?	Yes	Yes	Yes
Version 6 Unix file system (V6FS)	Yes	No	No	No	No	No	No	?	No
Version 7 Unix file system (V7FS)	Yes	No	No	No	No	No	No	?	No
exFAT	No	No	No	Partial (only if the file fits into one contiguous block range)	No	No	No	No	Yes (Linux)
FAT12	Partial (only inside of compressed volumes)	Partial (only inside of Stacker 3/4 and DriveSpace 3 compressed volumes)	No	Partial (only inside of compressed volumes)	No	No	No	No	Yes (Linux)
FAT16 / FAT16B / FAT16X	Partial (only inside of compressed volumes)	Partial (only inside of Stacker 3/4 and DriveSpace 3 compressed volumes)	No	Partial (only inside of compressed volumes)	No	No	No	No	Yes (Linux)
FAT32 / FAT32X	No	No	No	No	No	No	No	No	Yes (Linux)
GFS	Yes	No	Partial (Note: Only for "stuffed" inodes)	No	No	?	No	?	Yes
HPFS	No	No	No	Yes	No	?	No	?	Yes (Linux)
NTFS	Yes	Partial	No	Yes	No	Yes (approximately 700 bytes)	No	?	Yes (NT 6.1+; Linux)
HFS Plus	No	No	No	Yes	No	?	No	?	Yes (macOS)
FFS	Yes	8:1 (Note: Other block:fragment size ratios supported; 8:1 is typical and recommended by most implementations.)	No	No	No	No	No	?	No
UFS1	Yes	8:1	No	No	No	No	No	?	No
UFS2	Yes	8:1	No	No	Read-only so far	No	No	?	Yes
HAMMER	?	?	?	?	?	?	?	Yes	?
HAMMER2	?	?	?	?	?	Yes	?	Yes	?
LFS	Yes	8:1	No	No	No	?	No	Yes	?
EROFS	Yes	Yes	Yes	Yes	No	Yes	No	No	No
ext	Yes	No	No	No	No	?	No	No	No
Xiafs	Yes	No	No	No	No	?	No	?	?
ext2	Yes	No (Note: Fragments were planned, but never actually implemented on ext2 and ext3.)	No	No	No	?	No	No	Yes
ext3	Yes	No	No	No	No	?	No	No	Yes
ext4	Yes	No	No	Yes	No	Yes (inode size - 96B)	Yes	No	Yes
NOVA	Yes	No	No	Yes	No	?	No	Yes	?
F2FS	Yes	No	No	Partial (Note: Stores one largest extent in disk, and caches multiple extents in DRAM dynamically.)	No	Yes (approximately 3.4KB)	Yes	Yes	Yes
Lustre	Yes	No	No	Yes	No	?	Yes	?	?
NILFS	Yes	No	No	No	No	?	Yes	Yes	Yes (Linux NILFS2)
ReiserFS	Yes	Yes (Note: Tail packing is technically a special case of block suballocation where the suballocation unit size is always 1 byte.)	Yes	No	No	No	No	?	?
Reiser4	Yes	Yes	Yes	Yes (Note: In "extents" mode.)	No	No	Yes	?	Testing
OCFS	?	No	No	Yes	No	?	No	?	?
OCFS2	Yes	No	No	Yes	No	Yes	No	?	Yes (Linux)
XFS	Yes	No	No	Yes	No	No (not accepted)	Yes	Yes, on request	Yes (Linux)
JFS	Yes	Yes	No	Yes	No	Yes (256 bytes) (Note: _inline_all field in jfs_dinode.h)	No	?	Yes (Linux)
QFS	?	Yes	No	No	No	?	No	?	?
BFS	?	No	No	Yes	No	?	No	?	Yes (Haiku)
NSS	?	No	No	Yes	No	?	Yes	?	?
NWFS	?	Yes (Note: Each possible size (in sectors) of file tail has a corresponding suballocation block chain in which all the tails of that size are stored. The overhead of managing suballocation block chains is usually less than the amount of block overhead saved by being able to increase the block size but the process is less efficient if there is not much free disk space.)	No	No	No	?	No	?	?
Files-11 ODS-5	?	No	No	Yes	No	No	No	?	?
VxFS	Yes	?	No	Yes	No	?	No	?	?
UDF	Yes	No	No	Yes	No	Yes	Depends on implementation.	Yes, for write once read many media	No
Fossil	?	No	No	No	No	?	No	?	?
ZFS	Yes	Yes	No	No	Yes	Yes (112 bytes)	Yes	Yes	Yes
Btrfs	Yes	Yes	No	Yes	Yes	Yes (2 KiB)	Yes	Yes	Yes
bcachefs	Yes	Yes (Note: Effectively, implemented as inline data support for any small extent.)	Yes (Note: Effectively, implemented as many inline data extents packed in a single metadata node.)	Yes	No	Yes (half block size)	Yes	Yes	Yes
VMFS2	Yes	Yes	No	No	No	?	No	?	?
VMFS3	Yes	Yes	No	No	No	?	No	?	?
ReFS	Yes	?	?	?	No	?	?	Yes	Yes (NT 6.1+)
ISO 9660	No	No	No	ISO 9660 Level 3 only	No	?	No	No	No
ISO 9660: Rock Ridge extension	No	No	No	extended from ISO 9660	No	?	No	No	No
ISO 9660: Joliet extension	No	No	No	extended from ISO 9660	No	?	No	No	No
SquashFS	Yes	No	Yes	No	No	?	No	No	No
BlueStore/CephFS	Yes	?	?	?	?	?	No	Yes	Yes
File system	Sparse files	Block suballocation	Tail packing	Extents	Variable block size	Inline data (resident files)	Allocate-on-flush	Copy on write	Trim support

== OS support ==
File system	DOS	Linux	macOS	Windows 9x (historic)	Windows (current)	Classic Mac OS	FreeBSD	OS/2	BeOS	Minix	Solaris	z/OS	Android
DECtape	No	No	No	No	No	No	No	No	No	No	No	No	No
BeeGFS	No	Yes	?	No	No	No	No	No	?	?	?	No	No
Level-D	No	?	?	No	No	No	No	No	No	No	?	?	No
RT-11	No	No	No	No	No	No	No	No	No	No	No	No	No
APFS	No	Partial (read-only with apfs-fuse or linux-apfs)	Yes (Since macOS Sierra)	No	No	No	No	No	No	No	No	No	No
Version 6 Unix file system (V6FS)	No	?	No	No	No	No	No	No	No	No	No	No	No
Version 7 Unix file system (V7FS)	No	Yes	No	No	No	No	No	No	?	?	?	No	No
exFAT	No	Yes (since 5.4, available as a kernel module or FUSE driver for earlier versions)	Yes	No	Yes	No	Yes (available as a FUSE driver)	No	No	No	Yes (available as a FUSE driver)	No	With kernel 5.10
FAT12	Yes	Yes	Yes	Yes	Yes	Yes	Yes	Yes	Yes	Partial (via dosdir, dosread, doswrite)	Yes	?	Yes
FAT16 / FAT16B / FAT16X	Yes (FAT16 from DOS 3.0, FAT16B from DOS 3.31, FAT16X from DOS 7.0)	Yes	Yes	Yes	Yes	Yes	Yes	Yes	Yes	Partial (via dosdir, dosread, doswrite, not FAT16X)	Yes	?	Yes
FAT32 / FAT32X	Yes	Yes	Yes	Yes	Yes	?	Yes	Yes	Yes	No	Yes	?	Yes
GFS	No	Yes	?	No	No	No	No	?	?	?	?	?	No
HPFS	Partial (with third-party drivers)	Yes	?	No	No	?	Yes	Yes (from OS/2 1.2)	?	No	?	?	No
NTFS	Needs 3rd-party drivers	Yes Native since Linux Kernel 5.15 NTFS3. Older kernels may use backported NTFS3 driver or ntfs-3g	Read only, write support needs Paragon NTFS or ntfs-3g	Needs 3rd-party drivers like Paragon NTFS for Win98, DiskInternals NTFS Reader	Yes	No	Yes with ntfs-3g	?	Yes with ntfs-3g	No	Yes with ntfs-3g	?	With third party tools
HFS	No	Yes	No write support since Mac OS X 10.6 and no support at all since macOS 10.15	No	Needs Paragon HFS+	Yes	No	?	Yes	No	?	No	No
HFS Plus	No	Partial – writing support only to unjournalled FS	Yes	No	Needs Paragon HFS+	Yes from Mac OS 8.1	No	?	with addon	No	?	No	No
FFS	No	?	Yes	No	?	?	Yes	?	?	?	?	?	No
UFS1	No	Partial – read only	Yes	No	Partial (with ufs2tools, read only)	?	Yes	No	?	?	Yes	?	No
UFS2	No	Yes	Yes	No	Partial (with ufs2tools, read only)	?	Yes	No	?	?	?	?	No
LFS	No	?	?	No	No	?	No	No	?	?	?	?	No
EROFS	No	Yes	Needs – since erofs-utils 1.4	No	No	No	No	No	No	No	No	No	Yes
ext	No	Yes – until 2.1.20	No	No	No	No	No	No	No	No	No	No	No
Xiafs	No	Yes – until 2.1.20 Experimental port available to 2.6.32 and later	No	No	No	No	No	No	No	No	No	No	No
ext2	No	Yes	Needs Paragon ExtFS or ext2fsx	Partial (read-only, with explore2fs)	Needs Paragon ExtFS or partial with Ext2 IFS or ext2fsd	No	Yes	No	Yes	?	?	?	No
ext3	No	Yes	Needs Paragon ExtFS or partial with ext2fsx (journal not updated on writing)	Partial (read-only, with explore2fs)	Needs Paragon ExtFS or partial with Ext2 IFS or ext2fsd	Partial (read only)	Yes	No	with addon	?	Yes	?	Yes
ext4	No	Yes	Needs Paragon ExtFS	No	Yes, with the optional WSL2; physical and VHDX virtual disks.	?	Yes since FreeBSD 12.0	No	with addon	?	?	?	Yes
NOVA	No	Yes	No	No	No	No	No	No	No	No	No	No	No
F2FS	No	Yes	No	No	No	No	No	No	No	No	No	No	Yes
Lustre	No	Yes	?	No	No	?	No	?	?	?	Yes	?	No
NILFS	No	Yes as an external kernel module	?	No	?	?	No	?	?	?	?	?	No
ReiserFS	No	Yes – until 6.13	?	No	No	?	Partial – Read Only from 6.0 to 10.x and dropped in 11.0	?	with addon	?	?	?	No
Reiser4	No	Yes with a kernel patch	?	No	No	?	No	?	?	?	?	?	No
SpadFS	No	Yes	No	No	No	No	?	No	No	No	No	No	No
OCFS	No	Yes	?	No	No	?	No	No	?	?	?	?	No
OCFS2	No	Yes	?	No	No	?	No	No	?	?	?	?	No
XFS	No	Yes	?	No	No	?	Partial	?	with addon (read only)	?	?	?	No
JFS	No	Yes	?	No	No	?	No	Yes	?	?	?	?	No
QFS	No	Client	?	No	No	?	No	No	?	?	Yes	?	No
Be File System	No	Partial – read-only	?	No	No	?	No	No	Yes	?	?	?	No
NSS	No	Yes via EVMS (Note: Supported using only EVMS; not currently supported using LVM)	?	No	No	?	No	No	?	?	?	?	No
NWFS	Partial (with Novell drivers)	?	?	No	No	?	Yes	No	?	?	?	?	No
Files-11 ODS-2	No	?	?	No	No	?	No	No	?	?	?	?	No
Files-11 ODS-5	No	?	?	No	No	?	No	No	?	?	?	?	No
UDF	No	Yes	Yes	?	Yes	?	Yes	?	?	?	Yes	?	No
VxFS	No	Yes	?	No	No	?	No	No	?	?	Yes	?	No
Fossil	No	Yes (Note: Provided in Plan 9 from User Space)	Yes	No	No	No	Yes	No	No	No	Yes	?	No
ZFS	No	Yes with FUSE or as an external kernel module	Yes with Read/Write Developer Preview	No	With third-party software (OpenZFS).	No	Yes	No	No	No	Yes	No	No
Btrfs	No	Yes	?	No	Yes with WinBtrfs	?	No	?	?	?	?	?	No
bcachefs	No	Yes – until 6.18, now available as an external module	No	No	No	No	No	No	No	No	No	No	No
VMFS2	No	?	?	No	No	?	No	No	?	?	?	?	No
VMFS3	No	?	?	No	No	?	No	No	?	?	?	?	No
IBM HFS	No	No	No	No	No	No	No	No	No	No	No	Yes	No
IBM zFS	No	No	No	No	No	No	No	No	No	No	No	Yes	No
ReFS	No	Needs Paragon ReFS for Linux	?	No	Yes	?	?	?	?	?	?	?	No
ISO 9660	Yes	Yes	Yes	Yes	Yes	Yes	Yes	Yes	Yes	Yes	Yes	Yes	No
ISO 9660: Rock Ridge extension	No	Yes	Yes	No	No	No	Yes	No	No	Yes	Yes	?	No
ISO 9660: Joliet extension	No	Yes	Yes	Yes	Yes	?	Yes	Yes	Yes	?	Yes	?	No
SquashFS	No	Yes	Partial (There are ports of unsquashfs and mksquashfs.)	No	Partial (There are ports of unsquashfs and mksquashfs.)	No	Partial (There are ports of unsquashfs and mksquashfs and fusefs-port.)	No	No	No	No	No	No
BlueStore/CephFS	No	Yes	Client (Note: FUSE based driver available that can eliminate need for iSCSI gateways or SMB shares, but the physical backend store BlueStore only runs on Linux.)	No	Client (Note: Filesystem driver "Dokany" available that can eliminate need for iSCSI gateways or SMB shares, but the physical backend store BlueStore only runs on Linux.)	No	Client	No	No	No	No	No	No
File system	DOS	Linux	macOS	Windows 9x (historic)	Windows (current)	Classic Mac OS	FreeBSD	OS/2	BeOS	Minix	Solaris	z/OS	Android

== Limits ==
While storage devices usually have their size expressed in powers of ten (for instance a 1 TB solid-state drive will contain at least 1,000,000,000,000 (10^{12}, 1000^{4}) bytes), filesystem limits are invariably powers of two, so usually expressed with IEC prefixes. For instance, a 1 TiB limit means 2^{40}, 1024^{4} bytes. Approximations (rounding down) using power of 10 are also given below to clarify.

Many filesystems will not accept a NUL in a name (a character with value zero), so NUL is not considered in the table below, even if the text says “Any byte”.

File system	Maximum filename length	Allowable characters in directory entries (Note: These are the restrictions imposed by the on-disk directory entry structures themselves, as well as those imposed by operating systems across all file systems. Particular Installable File System drivers may place restrictions of their own on file and directory names. DOS, Windows, and OS/2 allow only the following characters from the current eight-bit OEM codepage in SFNs: A–Z, 0–9, characters ! # $ % & ' ( ) - @ ^ _ ` { } ~, as well as 0x80–0xFF and 0x20 (SPACE). Specifically, lowercase letters a–z, characters " * / : < > ? \ | + , . ; = [ ], control codes 0x00–0x1F, 0x7F and in some cases also 0xE5 are not allowed.) In LFNs, all Unicode characters except \ / : ? * " > < | and NUL are allowed in file and directory names across all filesystems. Unix-like systems disallow the characters / and NUL in file and directory names across all file systems.)	Maximum pathname length	Maximum file size	Maximum volume size (Note: For filesystems that have variable allocation unit (block/cluster) sizes, a range of size are given, indicating the maximum volume sizes for the minimum and the maximum possible allocation unit sizes of the filesystem (e.g. 512 bytes and 128 KiB (131.0 KB) for FAT — which is the cluster size range allowed by the on-disk data structures, although some Installable File System drivers and operating systems do not support cluster sizes larger than 32 KiB (32.76 KB)).)	Max number of files
AdvFS	255 bytes	Any byte except / (Note: In these filesystems the directory entries named "." and ".." have special status. Directory entries with these names are not prohibited, and indeed exist as normal directory entries in the on-disk data structures. However, they are mandatory directory entries, with mandatory values, that are automatically created in each directory when it is created; and directories without them are considered corrupt.)	No limit defined (Note: The on-disk structures have no inherent limit. Particular Installable File System drivers and operating systems may impose limits of their own, however. Limited by its Current Directory Structure (CDS), DOS does not support more than 32 directory levels (except for DR DOS 3.31-6.0) or full pathnames longer than 66 bytes for FAT, or 255 characters for LFNs. Windows NT does not support full pathnames longer than 32,767 bytes for NTFS. Older POSIX APIs which rely on the PATH_MAX constant have a limit of 4,096 bytes on Linux but this can be worked around. Linux itself has no hard path length limits.)	16 TiB (17.59 TB)	16 TiB (17.59 TB)	?
APFS	255 bytes	Any Unicode 9.0 character except /	?	8 EiB (9.223 EB)	?	2^{63}
bcachefs	512 bytes	Any byte except /	No limit defined	8 EiB (9.22 EB) (Note: File size can be greater than total available space due to compression, extent sharing and holes in sparse files.)	2040 PiB (2.3 EB) (Note: 255 member devices each limited to 8 PiB.)	2^{64} (Note: Only 2^{31}-4096 files/directories with inodes_32bit option in effect.)
BeeGFS	255 bytes	Any byte	No limit defined	16 EiB (18.44 EB)	16 EiB (18.44 EB)	?
BFS	255 bytes	Any byte	No limit defined	12,288 bytes to 260 GiB (279.1 GB) (Note: Varies wildly according to block size and fragmentation of block allocation groups.)	256 PiB (288.2 PB) to 2 EiB (2.305 EB)	Unlimited
BlueStore/CephFS	255 characters	any byte, except "/"	No limit defined	Max. 2^{64} bytes, 1 TiB (1.099 TB) by default	Not limited	Not limited, default is 100,000 files per directory
Btrfs	255 bytes	Any byte except /	No limit defined	16 EiB (18.44 EB)	16 EiB (18.44 EB)	2^{64}
CBM DOS	16 bytes	Any byte	No directory hierarchy (flat file system)	16 MiB (16.77 MB)	16 MiB (16.77 MB)	?
CP/M file system	8.3	ASCII except for < > . , ; : = ? * [ ]	No directory hierarchy (but accessibility of files depends on user areas via USER command since CP/M 2.2)	32 MiB (33.55 MB)	512 MiB (536.8 MB)	?
DECtape	6.3	A–Z, 0–9	DTxN:FILNAM.EXT = 15	369,280 bytes (577 × 640)	369,920 bytes (578 × 640)	?
Disk Operating System (GEC DOS)	?	?	?	? at least 131,072 bytes	?	?
Elektronika BK tape format	16 bytes	?	No directory hierarchy (flat file system)	64 KiB (65.53 KB)	Not limited. Approx. 800 KiB (819.2 KB) (one side) for 90 min cassette	?
EROFS	255 bytes	Any byte except /	No limit defined	16 EiB (18.44 EB)	1 EiB (1.152 EB)	2^{64}
exFAT	255 UTF-16 characters	Unicode except for control codes 0x0000–0x001F or " * / : < > ? \ |	32,760 characters with each path component no more than 255 characters	16 EiB (18.44 EB)	64 ZiB (75.55 ZB) (2^{76} bytes)	?
ext	255 bytes	Any byte except /	No limit defined	2 GiB (2.147 GB)	2 GiB (2.147 GB)	?
ext2	255 bytes	Any byte except /	No limit defined	16 GiB (17.17 GB) to 2 TiB (2.199 TB)	2 TiB (2.199 TB) to 32 TiB (35.18 TB)	?
ext3	255 bytes	Any byte except /	No limit defined	16 GiB (17.17 GB) to 2 TiB (2.199 TB)	2 TiB (2.199 TB) to 32 TiB (35.18 TB)	?
ext4	255 bytes	Any byte except /	No limit defined	16 GiB (17.17 GB) to 16 TiB (17.59 TB)	1 EiB (1.152 EB)	2^{32} (static inode limit specified at creation)
F2FS	255 bytes	Any byte except /	No limit defined	4,228,213,756 KiB (4.329 TB)	16 TiB (17.59 TB)	?
FAT (8-bit)	6.3 (binary files) / 9 characters (ASCII files)	ASCII (0x00 and 0xFF not allowed in first character)	No directory hierarchy (flat file system)	?	?	?
FAT12/FAT16	8.3 (255 UCS-2 characters with LFN) (Note: Depends on whether the FAT12, FAT16, and FAT32 implementation has support for LFNs. Where it does not, as in OS/2, DOS, Windows 95, Windows 98 in DOS-only mode and the Linux "msdos" driver, file names are limited to 8.3 format of eight-bit OEM characters (space-padded in both the basename and extension parts) and may not contain NUL (end-of-directory marker) or character 5 (replacement for character 229 which itself is used as deleted-file marker). Short names also must not contain lowercase letters. A few special device names (CON, NUL, AUX, PRN, LPT1, COM1, etc.) should be avoided, as some operating systems (notably DOS, OS/2 and Windows) reserve them.)	SFN: OEM A–Z, 0–9, ! # $ % & ' ( ) - @ ^ _ ` { } ~, 0x80–0xFF, 0x20. LFN: Unicode except " * / : < > ? \ |	No limit defined	32 MiB (33.55 MB) (4 GiB (4.294 GB)) (Note: On-disk structures would support up to 4 GiB (4.294 GB), but practical file size is limited by volume size.)	1 MiB (1.048 MB) to 32 MiB (33.55 MB)	?
FAT16B/FAT16X	8.3 (255 UCS-2 characters with LFN)	SFN: OEM A–Z, 0–9, ! # $ % & ' ( ) - @ ^ _ ` { } ~, 0x80–0xFF, 0x20. LFN: Unicode except " * / : < > ? \ |	No limit defined	2 (4) GiB (2.147 GB)	16 MiB (16.77 MB) to 2 (4) GiB (2.147 GB)	?
FAT32/FAT32X	8.3 (255 UCS-2 characters with LFN)	SFN: OEM A–Z, 0–9, ! # $ % & ' ( ) - @ ^ _ ` { } ~, 0x80–0xFF, 0x20. LFN: Unicode except " * / : < > ? \ |	32,760 characters with each path component no more than 255 characters	4 GiB (4.294 GB)	512 MiB (536.8 MB) to 16 TiB (17.59 TB) (Note: While FAT32 partitions this large work fine once created, some software won't allow creation of FAT32 partitions larger than 32 GiB (34.35 GB). This includes, notoriously, the Windows XP installation program and the Disk Management console in Windows 2000, XP, 2003 and Vista. Use FDISK from a Windows ME Emergency Boot Disk to avoid.)	?
FATX	42 bytes	ASCII.	No limit defined	2 GiB (2.147 GB)	16 MiB (16.77 MB) to 2 GiB (2.147 GB)	?
FFS	255 bytes	Any byte except /	No limit defined	4 GiB (4.294 GB)	256 TiB (281.4 TB)	?
Files-11 ODS-1	9.3 in RADIX-50	A–Z, 0–9, $	No limit defined; only two-level paths supported by operating systems	2 TiB (2.199 TB)	2 TiB (2.199 TB)	2^{16}-1
Files-11 ODS-2	20 bytes	A–Z, 0–9, $, -, _	4,096 bytes (Note: Maximum pathname length is 4,096 bytes, but quoted limits on individual components add up to 1,664 bytes.)	2 TiB (2.199 TB)	2 TiB (2.199 TB)	2^{24}-1
Files-11 ODS-5	236 bytes (Note: Maximum combined filename/filetype length is 236 bytes; each component has an individual maximum length of 255 bytes.)	ISO 8859-1 or UCS-2	4,096 bytes	2 TiB (2.199 TB)	2 TiB (2.199 TB)	?
Fossil	?	?	?	?	?	?
GEC DOS filing system extended	8 bytes	A–Z, 0–9. Period was directory separator	? No limit defined (workaround for OS limit)	? at least 131,072 bytes	?	?
GEMDOS	8.3	A–Z, a–z, 0–9 ! @ # $ % ^ & ( ) + - = ~ ` ; ' " , < > | [ ] ( ) _	?	?	?	?
GFS2	255 bytes	Any byte except /	No limit defined	100 TiB (109.95 TB) to 8 EiB (9.223 EB) (Note: Depends on CPU arch. For 32bit kernels the max is 16 TiB (17.59 TB).)	100 TiB (109.95 TB) to 8 EiB (9.223 EB)	?
GFS	255 bytes	Any byte except /	No limit defined	2 TiB (2.199 TB) to 8 EiB (9.223 EB) (Note: Depends on kernel version and arch. For 2.4 kernels the max is 2 TiB (2.199 TB). For 32-bit 2.6 kernels it is 16 TiB (17.59 TB). For 64-bit 2.6 kernels it is 8 EiB (9.223 EB).)	2 TiB (2.199 TB) to 8 EiB (9.223 EB)	?
GPFS	255 UTF-8 codepoints	Any byte	No limit defined	9 EiB (10.37 EB)	524,288 YiB (2^{99} bytes)	?
HAMMER	1023 bytes	Any byte except /	?	?	1 EiB (1.152 EB)	?
HFS	31 bytes	Any byte except :; in macOS, : in file names is converted to / in the file system, and / are disallowed	Unlimited	2 GiB (2.147 GB)	2 TiB (2.199 TB)	?
HFS Plus	255 UTF-16 code units (Note: The "classic" Mac OS provides two sets of functions to retrieve file names from an HFS Plus volume, one of them returning the full Unicode names, the other shortened names fitting in the older 31 byte limit to accommodate older applications.)	Any valid Unicode character except :; (Note: HFS Plus mandates support for an escape sequence to allow arbitrary Unicode. Users of older software might see the escape sequences instead of the desired characters.) in macOS, : in file names is converted to / in the file system, and / are disallowed	Unlimited	slightly less than 8 EiB (9.223 EB)	slightly less than 8 EiB (9.223 EB)	?
High Sierra Format	?	?	?	?	?	?
HPFS	255 bytes	Any byte (Note: The "." and ".." directory entries in HPFS that are seen by applications programs are a partial fiction created by the Installable File System drivers. The on-disk data structure for a directory does not contain entries by those names, but instead contains a special "start" entry. Whilst on-disk directory entries by those names are not physically prohibited, they cannot be created in normal operation, and a directory containing such entries is corrupt.)	No limit defined	2 GiB (2.147 GB)	2 TiB (2.199 TB) (Note: This is the limit of the on-disk structures. The HPFS Installable File System driver for OS/2 uses the top five bits of the volume sector number for its own use, limiting the volume size that it can handle to 64 GiB (68.71 GB).)	?
IBM SFS	8.8	?	Non-hierarchical	?	?	?
ISO 9660:1988	Level 1: 8.3, Level 2 & 3: ~ 180	Depends on Level (Note: ISO 9660#Restrictions)	~ 180 bytes?	4 GiB (4.294 GB) (Level 1 & 2) to 8 TiB (8.796 TB) (Level 3) (Note: Through the use of multi-extents, a file can consist of multiple segments, each up to 4 GiB (4.294 GB) in size. See ISO 9660#The 2 GiB (2.147 GB) (or 4 GiB (4.294 GB) depending on implementation) file size limit)	8 TiB (8.796 TB) (Note: Assuming the typical 2048 Byte sector size. The volume size is specified as a 32 bit value identifying the number of sectors on the volume.)	?
ISO 9660:1999	?	?	?	?	?	?
JFS	255 bytes	Any Unicode	No limit defined	4 PiB (4.503 PB)	32 PiB (36.02 PB)	?
JFS1	255 bytes	Any byte except /	No limit defined	8 EiB (9.223 EB)	512 TiB (562.9 TB) to 4 PiB (4.503 PB)	?
ISO 9660: Joliet extension	64 characters	All UCS-2 code except *, /, \, :, ;, and ?	?	same as ISO 9660:1988	same as ISO 9660:1988	?
Level-D	6.3	A–Z, 0–9	DEVICE:FILNAM.EXT[PROJCT,PROGRM] = 7 + 10 + 15 = 32; + 5 × 7 for SFDs = 67	34,359,738,368 words (2^{35}); 206,158,430,208 SIXBIT bytes	Approx 12 GiB (12.88 GB) (64 × 178 MiB (186.6 MB))	?
Lustre	255 bytes	Any byte	No limit defined	16 EiB (18.44 EB) on ZFS	16 EiB (18.44 EB)	?
MFS	255 bytes	Any byte except :	No directory hierarchy (flat file system)	256 MiB (268.4 MB)	256 MiB (268.4 MB)	?
MicroDOS file system	14 bytes	?	?	16 MiB (16.77 MB)	32 MiB (33.55 MB)	?
Minix V1 FS	14 or 30 bytes, set at filesystem creation time	Any byte	No limit defined	256.5 MiB (268.9 MB) (Note: Sparse files can be larger than the file system size, even though they can't contain more data.)	64 MiB (67.10 MB)	?
Minix V2 FS	14 or 30 bytes, set at filesystem creation time	Any byte	No limit defined	2 GiB (2.147 GB)	1 GiB (1.073 GB)	?
Minix V3 FS	60 bytes	Any byte	No limit defined	2 GiB (2.147 GB)	4 GiB (4.294 GB)	?
NILFS	255 bytes	Any byte except /	No limit defined	8 EiB (9.223 EB)	8 EiB (9.223 EB)	?
NOVA	255 bytes	Any byte except /	No limit defined	16 EiB (18.44 EB)	16 EiB (18.44 EB)	?
NSS	256 UTF-16 code units	Depends on namespace used (Note: NSS allows files to have multiple names, in separate namespaces.)	Only limited by client	8 TiB (8.796 TB)	8 TiB (8.796 TB)	?
NTFS	255 UTF-16 code units	In Win32 namespace: any UTF-16 code unit (case-insensitive) except /\:*"?<>| In POSIX namespace: any UTF-16 code unit (case-sensitive) except /	32,767 UTF-16 code units with each path component (directory or filename) up to 255 UTF-16 code units long. However, the limit is approximate due to UNC, and some limitations may be removed on demand.	16 TiB (17.59 TB) to 8 PiB (9.007 PB) (Note: This is the limit of the on-disk structures. The NTFS driver for Windows NT limits the volume size that it can handle to 256 TiB (281.4 TB) and the file size to 16 TiB (17.59 TB) respectively; in Windows 10 version 1709, the limit is 8 PiB (9.007 PB) when using 2 MiB (2.097 MB) cluster size.)	16 TiB (17.59 TB) to 8 PiB (9.007 PB)	2^{32}
NWFS	80 bytes (Note: Some namespaces had lower name length limits. "LONG" had an 80-byte limit, "NWFS" 80 bytes, "NFS" 40 bytes and "DOS" imposed 8.3 filename.)	Depends on namespace used	No limit defined	4 GiB (4.294 GB)	1 TiB (1.099 TB)	?
OCFS	255 bytes	Any byte	No limit defined	8 TiB (8.796 TB)	8 TiB (8.796 TB)	?
OCFS2	255 bytes	Any byte	No limit defined	4 PiB (4.503 PB)	4 PiB (4.503 PB)	?
QFS	255 bytes	Any byte	No limit defined	16 EiB (18.44 EB) (Note: QFS allows files to exceed the size of disk when used with its integrated HSM, as only part of the file need reside on disk at any one time.)	4 PiB (4.503 PB)	?
ReFS	255 UTF-16 code units	In Win32 namespace: any UTF-16 code unit (case-insensitive) except /\:*"?<>| In POSIX namespace: any UTF-16 code unit (case-sensitive) except /	32,767 characters with each path component (directory or filename) up to 255 characters long	16 EiB (18.44 EB)	1 YiB (1.208 YB)	?
ReiserFS	4032 bytes/255 characters	Any byte except /	No limit defined	8 TiB (8.796 TB) (Note: ReiserFS has a theoretical maximum file size of 1 EiB (1.152 EB), but "page cache limits this to 8 Ti on architectures with 32-bit int") (v3.6), 4 GiB (4.294 GB) (v3.5)	16 TiB (17.59 TB)	?
Reiser4	3976 bytes	Any byte except /	No limit defined	8 TiB (8.796 TB) on x86	?	?
ISO 9660: Rock Ridge extension	255 bytes	Any byte except /	No limit defined	same as ISO 9660:1988	same as ISO 9660:1988	?
RT-11	6.3 in RADIX-50	A–Z, 0–9, $	No directory hierarchy (flat file system)	33,554,432 bytes (65536 × 512)	33,554,432 bytes	?
SquashFS	256 bytes	?	No limit defined	16 EiB (18.44 EB)	16 EiB (18.44 EB)	?
UDF	255 bytes	Any Unicode	1,023 bytes (Note: This restriction might be lifted in newer versions.)	16 EiB (18.44 EB)	512 MiB (536.8 MB) to 16 TiB (17.59 TB)	?
UFS1	255 bytes	Any byte except /	No limit defined	16 GiB (17.17 GB) to 256 TiB (281.4 TB)	16 EiB (18.44 EB)	Subdirectory per directory is 32,767
UFS2	255 bytes	Any byte except /	No limit defined	512 GiB (549.7 GB) to 32 PiB (36.02 PB)	512 ZiB (604.4 ZB) (2^{79} bytes)	Subdirectory per directory is 32,767
UniFS	No limit defined (depends on client)	?	No limit defined (depends on client)	Available cache space at time of write (depends on platform)	No limit defined	No limit defined
VaultFS	configurable (1024 default)	Any byte	No limit defined	No limit defined	No limit defined	No limit defined
Version 6 Unix file system (V6FS)	14 bytes	Any byte except /	No limit defined	16 MiB (16.77 MB) (Note: The file size in the inode is one eight-bit byte followed by one 16-bit word, for 24 bits. The actual maximum was 8,847,360 bytes, with seven singly-indirect blocks and one doubly-indirect block; PWB/UNIX 1.0's variant had eight singly-indirect blocks, making the maximum 524,288 bytes or half a MB.)	32 MiB (33.55 MB)	?
Version 7 Unix file system (V7FS)	14 bytes	Any byte except /	No limit defined	1 GiB (1.073 GB) (Note: The actual maximum was 1,082,201,088 bytes, with ten direct blocks, one singly-indirect block, one doubly-indirect block, and one triply-indirect block. The 4.0BSD and 4.1BSD versions, and the System V version, used 1,024-byte blocks rather than 512-byte blocks, making the maximum 4,311,812,608 bytes or approximately 4 GiB (4.294 GB).)	2 TiB (2.199 TB)	?
VMFS2	128	Any byte except /	2,048	4 TiB (4.398 TB) (Note: Maximum file size on a VMFS volume depends on the block size for that VMFS volume. The figures here are obtained by using the maximum block size.)	64 TiB (70.36 TB)	?
VMFS3	128	Any byte except /	2,048	2 TiB (2.199 TB)	64 TiB (70.36 TB)	?
VxFS	255 bytes	Any byte except /	No limit defined	16 EiB (18.44 EB)	?	?
XFS	255 bytes (Note: Note that the filename can be much longer XFS#Extended attributes)	Any byte except /	No limit defined	8 EiB (9.223 EB) (Note: XFS has a limitation under Linux 2.4 of 64 TiB (70.36 TB) file size, but Linux 2.4 only supports a maximum block size of 2 TiB (2.199 TB). This limitation is not present under IRIX.)	8 EiB (9.223 EB)	2^{64}
Xiafs	248 bytes	Any byte	No limit defined	64 MiB (67.10 MB)	2 GiB (2.147 GB)	?
ZFS	1023 bytes	Any byte except /	No limit defined	16 EiB (18.44 EB)	268,435,456 QiB (2^{128} bytes)	2^{128}
File system	Maximum filename length	Allowable characters in directory entries	Maximum pathname length	Maximum file size	Maximum volume size	Max number of files

Date ranges and time granularity
File system	Start date (time)	End date (time)	Granularity (last modified time)
APFS	1970-01-01 00:00:00	2554-07-21 23:34:33	0.000000001 seconds (1 nanosecond)
Btrfs	1970-01-01 − ~292 billion years	1970-01-01 + ~292 billion years	0.000000001 seconds (1 nanosecond)
exFAT (Note: exFAT records 10-millisecond increments for last modification and creation time stamps, but only one-second for the last access time stamp. exFAT file system specification)	1980-01-01 00:00:00	2107-12-31 23:59:59	0.01 seconds (10 milliseconds)
ext2, ext3	1901-12-14 20:45:52	2038-01-19 03:14:07	1 second
ext4	1901-12-14 20:45:52	2446-05-10 22:38:55	0.000000001 seconds (1 nanosecond)
FAT12, FAT16, FAT32 (Note: FAT has different granularities for different time stamps. Only the date of last access is recorded, not the time. The file creation time (treated as "change time" by Linux for this specific file system) is recorded more granularly, at a hundredth of a second. FAT: General Overview of On-Disk Format, page 23.)	1980-01-01 00:00:00	2107-12-31 23:59:58	2 seconds
ISO 9660	0001-01-01	9999-12-31 (Note: Software that doesn't recognize Extended Attribute Records in ISO 9660 will only recognize a date range from 1900 to 2155, see section 9.1.5 Recording Date and Time in the source.)	0.01 seconds (10 milliseconds)
JFS	Unknown	Unknown	0.000000001 seconds (1 nanosecond)
MFS, HFS, HFS Plus	1904-01-01 00:00:00	2040-02-06 06:28:15	1 second
NTFS	1601-01-01	60056-05-28	0.0000001 seconds (100 nanoseconds)
ReiserFS	1901-12-14 20:45:52	2038-01-19	1 second
tux3	Unknown	Unknown	0.00390625 seconds (1/256th of a second)
UDF	0001-01-01	9999-12-31	0.000001 seconds (1 microsecond)
UFS1	1901-12-14 20:45:52	2038-01-19 03:14:07	Originally one second; 0.000000001 seconds (1 nanosecond) in 4.4BSD and 4.4BSD-derived systems.
UFS2	1970-01-01 − ~292 billion years	1970-01-01 + ~292 billion years	0.000000001 seconds (1 nanosecond)
XFS	1901-12-13	2486-07-02	0.000000001 seconds (1 nanosecond)

== See also ==
- List of file systems
- Comparison of file archivers
- List of archive formats
- Comparison of archive formats
