= Snapshot (computer storage) =

Recorded state of a computer storage system at a particular point in time

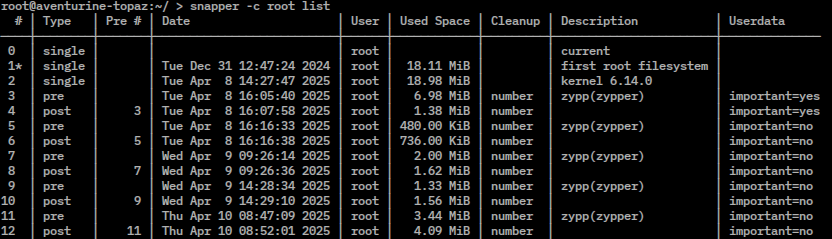
Example of snapshots of a Btrfs filesystem, managed with snapper

In computer systems, a snapshot is the state of a system at a particular point in time. The term was coined as an analogy to that in photography.

== Rationale ==
A full backup of a large data set may take a long time to complete. On multi-tasking or multi-user systems, there may be writes to that data while it is being backed up. This prevents the backup from being atomic and introduces a version skew that may result in data corruption. For example, if a user moves a file into a directory that has already been backed up, then that file would be completely missing on the backup media, since the backup operation had already taken place before the addition of the file. Version skew may also cause corruption with files which change their size or contents underfoot while being read.

One approach to safely backing up live data is to temporarily disable write access to data during the backup, either by stopping the accessing applications or by using the locking API provided by the operating system to enforce exclusive read access. This is tolerable for low-availability systems (on desktop computers and small workgroup servers, on which regular downtime is acceptable). High-availability 24/7 systems, however, cannot bear service stoppages.

To avoid downtime, high-availability systems may instead perform the backup on a snapshot—a read-only copy of the data set frozen at a point in time—and allow applications to continue writing to their data. Most snapshot implementations are efficient and can create snapshots in O(1). In other words, the time and I/O needed to create the snapshot does not increase with the size of the data set; by contrast, the time and I/O required for a direct backup is proportional to the size of the data set. In some systems once the initial snapshot is taken of a data set, subsequent snapshots copy the changed data only, and use a system of pointers to reference the initial snapshot. This method of pointer-based snapshots consumes less disk capacity than if the data set was repeatedly cloned.

== Implementations ==
=== Volume managers ===
Some Unix systems have snapshot-capable logical volume managers. These implement copy-on-write on entire block devices by copying changed blocks‍—‌just before they are to be overwritten within "parent" volumes‍—‌to other storage, thus preserving a self-consistent past image of the block device. Filesystems on such snapshot images can later be mounted as if they were on a read-only media.

Some volume managers also allow creation of writable snapshots, extending the copy-on-write approach by disassociating any blocks modified within the snapshot from their "parent" blocks in the original volume. Such a scheme could be also described as performing additional copy-on-write operations triggered by the writes to snapshots.

On Linux, Logical Volume Manager (LVM) allows creation of both read-only and read-write snapshots. Writable snapshots were introduced with the LVM version 2 (LVM2).

=== File systems ===
Some file systems, such as WAFL, (Note: WAFL is not a file system. WAFL is a file layout that provides mechanisms that enable a variety of file systems and technologies that want to access disk blocks.) fossil for Plan 9 from Bell Labs, and ODS-5, internally track old versions of files and make snapshots available through a special namespace. Others, like UFS2, provide an operating system API for accessing file histories. In NTFS, access to snapshots is provided by the Volume Shadow-copying Service (VSS) in Windows XP and Windows Server 2003 and Shadow Copy in Windows Vista. Melio FS provides snapshots via the same VSS interface for shared storage. Snapshots have also been available in the NSS (Novell Storage Services) file system on NetWare since version 4.11, and more recently on Linux platforms in the Open Enterprise Server product. On AIX, JFS2 supports snapshots. On macOS, APFS supports snapshots.

EMC's Isilon OneFS clustered storage platform implements a single scalable file system that supports read-only snapshots at the file or directory level. Any file or directory within the file system can be snapshotted and the system will implement a copy-on-write or point-in-time snapshot dynamically based on which method is determined to be optimal for the system.

On Linux, the Btrfs and OCFS2 file systems support creating snapshots (cloning) of individual files. Additionally, Btrfs also supports the creation of snapshots of subvolumes.

== See also ==
- Application checkpointing
- Persistence (computer science)
- Sandbox (computer security)
- Storage Hypervisor
- System image
- Virtual machine
