= Extended file system =

Linux file system

ext
- Developer(s): Rémy Card
- Full name: extended file system
- Introduced: April 1992; 33 years ago with Linux 0.96c
- Discontinued: 14 January 1997; 28 years ago with Linux 2.1.21
- Preceded by: MINIX file system
- Succeeded by: ext2

Structures
- Directory contents: Table
- File allocation: Free space: Linked list; Metadata: Table
- Bad blocks: Table

Limits
- Max volume size: 2 GB
- Max filename length: 255 characters

Features
- File system permissions: Unix permissions
- Transparent encryption: No
- Copy-on-write: No

The extended file system, or ext, was implemented in April 1992 as the first file system created specifically for the Linux kernel. Although ext is not a specific file system name, it has been succeeded by ext2, ext3, and ext4. It has metadata structure inspired by traditional Unix File System principles, and was designed by Rémy Card to overcome certain limitations of the MINIX file system. It was the first implementation that used the virtual file system (VFS), for which support was added in the Linux kernel in version 0.96c, and it could handle file systems up to 2 gigabytes (GB) in size.

ext was the first in the series of extended file systems. In 1993, it was superseded by both ext2 and Xiafs, which competed for a time, but ext2 won because of its long-term viability: ext2 remedied issues with ext, such as the immutability of inodes and fragmentation.

== Other extended file systems ==
There are other members in the extended file system family:

- ext2, the second extended file system.
- ext3, the third extended file system.
- ext4, the fourth extended file system.

== See also ==
- List of file systems
- Comparison of file systems
