= High Performance File System =

Filesystem created for OS/2 operating system

HPFS
- Developer(s): Microsoft, IBM
- Full name: High Performance File System
- Introduced: November 1989; 36 years ago with OS/2 1.2
- Partition IDs: 0x07 (MBR)

Structures
- Directory contents: B tree
- File allocation: B+ tree
- Bad blocks: List

Limits
- Max volume size: 64 GB (as implemented); 2 TB (theoretical)
- Max file size: 2 GB
- Max no. of files: Unlimited
- Max filename length: 255 characters
- Allowed filename characters: Single-byte from 0x20 to 0xFF

Features
- Dates recorded: Access, Creation, Modified
- Forks: Yes
- Attributes: Read-only, hidden, system, archive
- File system permissions: Yes (only in HPFS386)
- Transparent compression: No
- Transparent encryption: No

Other
- Supported operating systems: OS/2, Windows NT, Linux, DragonFly BSD, eComStation, ArcaOS

HPFS (High Performance File System) is a file system created specifically for the OS/2 operating system to improve upon the limitations of the FAT file system. It was written by Gordon Letwin and others at Microsoft and added to OS/2 version 1.2, at that time still a joint undertaking of Microsoft and IBM, and released in 1988.

== Overview ==
Compared with FAT, HPFS provided a number of additional capabilities:

- Support for mixed case file names, in different code pages
- Support for long file names (255 characters as opposed to FAT's 8.3 naming scheme)
- More efficient use of disk space (files are not stored using multiple-sector clusters but on a per-sector basis)
- An internal architecture that keeps related items close to each other on the disk volume
- Less fragmentation of data
- Extent-based space allocation
- Separate datestamps for last modification, last access, and creation (as opposed to last-modification-only datestamp in then-times implementations of FAT)
- B+ tree structure for directories
- Root directory located at the midpoint, rather than at the beginning of the disk, for faster average access

HPFS also can keep 64 KB of metadata ("extended attributes") per file.

IBM offers two kinds of IFS drivers for this file system:

- The standard one with a cache limited to 2 MB
- HPFS386 provided with certain server versions of OS/2, or as added component for the server versions that did not come with it

HPFS386's cache is limited by the amount of available memory in OS/2's system memory arena and was implemented in 32-bit assembly language. HPFS386 is a ring 0 driver (allowing direct hardware access and direct interaction with the kernel) with built-in SMB networking properties that are usable by various server daemons, whereas HPFS is a ring 3 driver. Thus, HPFS386 is faster than HPFS and highly optimized for server applications. It is also highly tunable by experienced administrators.

Though IBM still had rights to HPFS, its agreement with Microsoft to continue licensing the HPFS386 version was contingent upon the company paying Microsoft a licensing fee for each copy sold. This was a result of the Microsoft and IBM collaboration that gave both the right to use Windows and OS/2 technology.

Due to the Microsoft dependence, limited partition size, file size limit of 2 GB and the long disk-check times after a crash, IBM ported the journaling file system, JFS, to OS/2 as a substitute.

DOS and Linux support HPFS via third-party drivers. Windows NT versions 3.51 and earlier had native support for HPFS.

== Native support under Windows ==
Windows 95 and its successors Windows 98 and Windows Me have no support for HPFS. They listed the NTFS partitions of networked computers as "HPFS", because NTFS and HPFS share the same filesystem identification number in the partition table.

Windows NT 3.1 and 3.5 have native read/write support for local disks and can even be installed onto an HPFS partition.

Windows NT 3.51 can also read and write from local HPFS formatted drives. Starting with Windows NT 4 the filesystem driver PINBALL.SYS enabling the read/write access is not shipped anymore. Later Windows versions do not ship with this driver. Note that this driver is limited to 4GB HPFS volumes.

Microsoft retained rights to OS/2 technologies, including the HPFS filesystem, after they ceased collaboration with IBM. Since Windows NT 3.1 was designed for more rigorous (enterprise-class) use than previous versions of Windows, it included support for HPFS (and NTFS) giving it a larger storage capacity than the FAT12 and FAT16 filesystems. However, since HPFS lacks a journal, any recovery after an unexpected shutdown or other error state takes progressively longer as the filesystem grows. A utility such as CHKDSK would need to scan each entry in the filesystem to ensure no errors are present, a problem which is vastly reduced on NTFS, which simply replays the journal.

== See also ==
- Comparison of file systems
- HPFS BPB
