= Harriet Coverston =

American computer scientist

Harriet Coverston is an American computer scientist and software developer focused on large-scale secondary storage environments, who has previously participated to various kernel developments in HPC systems. Harriet is an expert in large scale archiving systems, having participated to several large projects and product developments.

== Career ==
Coverston started her career at Lawrence Livermore National Laboratory in 1967 working on the Livermore Timesharing System for CDC 7600 within a team of five people. She stayed until 1974, and then moved to Control Data Corporation for 12 years to collaborate on the Cyber 205 Operating System and CDCNET.

In January 1986, Coverston co-founded LSC (Large Scale Configurations) where she was vice-president of technology more than 15 years. LSC was a ISV developing SAM-QFS and QFS, two software dedicated to manage cold and archived data. QFS is a high performance file system and SAM is advanced storage management.

In 2001, Sun Microsystems acquired LSC and Coverston became a distinguished engineer at Sun, a position she occupied until 2010. Oracle closed the acquisition of Sun early 2010.

Coverston co-founded Versity in March 2011 with Bruce Gilpin and acts as its CTO since its inception through 2026. Versity is a storage ISV developer of archiving software. The company developed ScoutFS, a clustered disk file system, coupled with its archiving manager companion ScoutAM and the team also has added a S3 gateway.

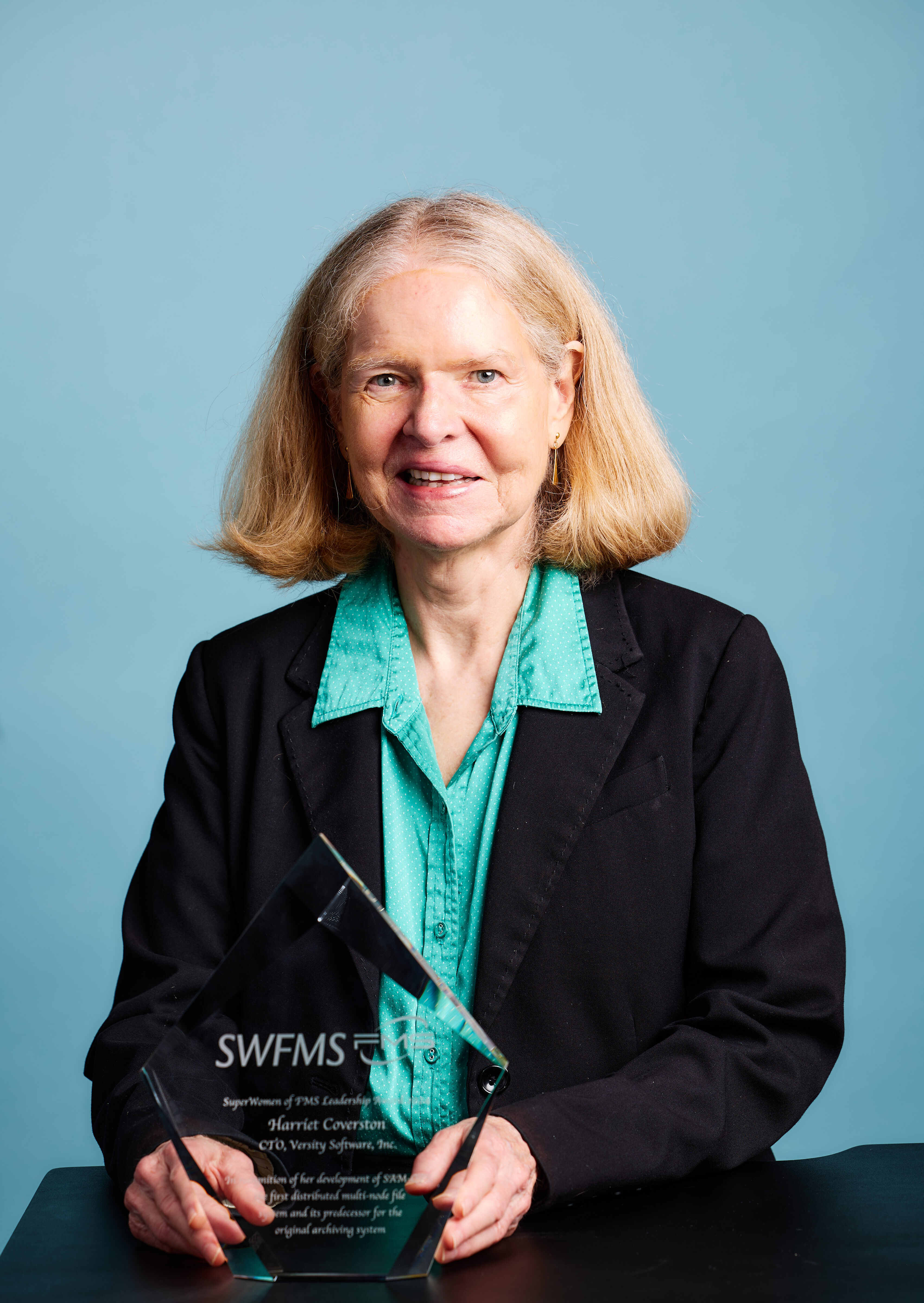
Harriet Coverston, CTO and co-founder, Versity Software

In August 2024, at the annual Future of Memory and Storage conference in Santa Clara, CA, she received the SuperWomen of FMS Leadership Award, for her contributions during her long career in data archiving domain.

== Education ==
Harriet Coverston earned a BA in Mathematics from Florida State University.

== Patents ==
Harriet participates and co-owns 15 patents:

- File archiving system and method
- Delegation in a file system with distributed components
- File system with distributed components
- Method and system for collective file access using an mmap (memory-mapped file)
- Dynamic routing of I/O requests in a multi-tier storage environment
- Dynamic data migration in a multi-tier storage system
- File archiving system and method
- Delegation in a file system with distributed components
- File system with distributed components
- Method, system, and program for providing data to an application program from a file in a file system
- Method, system, and program for managing files in a file system
- Archiving file system for data servers in a distributed network environment
- Method and apparatus for insuring recovery of file control information for secondary storage systems
- Method and apparatus for file storage allocation for secondary storage using large and small file blocks
