= Novell Storage Services =

Journaling file system

NSS
- Developer(s): Novell
- Full name: Novell Storage Services
- Introduced: 1998; 27 years ago with NetWare 5
- Partition IDs: 0x69

Structures
- Directory contents: B+ tree
- File allocation: ?
- Bad blocks: ?

Limits
- Max volume size: 8 EB
- Max file size: 8 EB
- Max no. of files: 8 trillion
- Max filename length: 256 16-bit Unicode characters
- Allowed filename characters: Variable; depends on namespace being used

Features
- Dates recorded: Access, Creation, Modified, Archived, Metadata Modified
- Date range: Unknown
- Forks: Yes (available through the AFP namespace, which is always loaded)
- Attributes: Readonly, Hidden, System, Archive, Sharable, Transaction, Immediate Purge, Rename Inhibit, Delete Inhibit, Copy Inhibit, Link, Remote Data Access, Remote Data Inhibit, Compress Immediate, Data Stream Compress, Do Not Compress, No Stream Compress, Attr Archive, Volatile, Execute
- File system permissions: Netware ACLs: Supervisor, Read, Write, Create, Erase, Modify, File Scan, Access Control; POSIX (RWX per owner, group and all) when NFS namespace is loaded
- Transparent compression: Yes
- Transparent encryption: Yes
- Copy-on-write: Yes / snapshots

Other
- Supported operating systems: Novell NetWare, SUSE Linux
- Website: https://www.novell.com/documentation/open-enterprise-server-2018/stor_nss_lx/data/front.html

Novell Storage Services (NSS) is a file system used by the Novell NetWare network operating system. Support for NSS was introduced in 2004 to SUSE Linux via low-level network NCPFS protocol. It has some unique features that make it especially useful for setting up shared volumes on a file server in a local area network.

NSS is a 64-bit journaling file system with a balanced tree algorithm for the directory structure. Its published specifications (as of NetWare 6.5) are:

- Maximum file size: 8 EB
- Maximum partition size: 8 EB
- Maximum device size (Physical or Logical): 8 EB
- Maximum pool size: 8 EB
- Maximum volume size: 8 EB
- Maximum files per volume: 8 trillion
- Maximum mounted volumes per server: unlimited if all are NSS
- Maximum open files per server: no practical limit
- Maximum directory tree depth: limited only by client
- Maximum volumes per partition: unlimited
- Maximum extended attributes: no limit on number of attributes.
- Maximum data streams: no limit on number of data streams.
- Unicode characters supported by default
- Support for different name spaces: DOS, Microsoft Windows Long names (loaded by default), Unix, Apple Macintosh
- Support for restoring deleted files (salvage)
- Support for transparent compression
- Support for encrypted volumes
- Support for data shredding

== See also ==
- NetWare File System (NWFS)
- Comparison of file systems
- List of file systems
