= Block suballocation =

Filesystem feature

Block suballocation is a feature of some computer file systems which allows large blocks or allocation units to be used while making efficient use of empty space at the end of large files, space which would otherwise be lost for other use to internal fragmentation.

In file systems that don't support fragments, this feature is also called tail merging or tail packing because it is commonly done by packing the "tail", or last partial block, of multiple files into a single block.

== Rationale ==
File systems have traditionally divided the disk into equally sized blocks to simplify their design and limit the worst-case fragmentation. Block sizes are typically multiples of 512 bytes due to the size of hard disk sectors. When files are allocated by some traditional file systems, only whole blocks can be allocated to individual files. But as file sizes are often not multiples of the file system block size, this design inherently results in the last blocks of files (called tails) occupying only a part of the block, resulting in what is called internal fragmentation (not to be confused with external fragmentation). This waste of space can be significant if the file system stores many small files and can become critical when attempting to use higher block sizes to improve performance. UFS and other derived UNIX file systems support fragments which greatly mitigate this effect.

== Suballocation schemes ==
Block suballocation addresses this problem by dividing up a tail block in some way to allow it to store fragments from other files.

Some block suballocation schemes can perform allocation at the byte level; most, however, simply divide up the block into smaller ones (the divisor usually being some power of 2). For example, if a 38 KiB file is to be stored in a file system using 32 KiB blocks, the file would normally span two blocks, or 64 KiB, for storage; the remaining 26 KiB of the second block becomes unused slack space. With an 8 KiB block suballocation, however, the file would occupy just 6 KiB of the second block, leave 2 KiB (of the 8 KiB suballocation block) slack and free the other 24 KiB of the block for other files.

=== Tail packing ===
Some file systems have since been designed to take advantage of this unused space, and can pack the tails of several files in a single shared tail block. While this may, at first, seem like it would significantly increase file system fragmentation, the negative effect can be mitigated with readahead features on modern operating systems – when dealing with short files, several tails may be close enough to each another to be read together, and thus a disk seek is not introduced. Such file systems often employ heuristics in order to determine whether tail packing is worthwhile in a given situation, and defragmentation software may use a more evolved heuristic.

== Efficiency ==
In some scenarios where the majority of files are shorter than half the block size, such as in a folder of small source code files or small bitmap images, tail packing can increase storage efficiency even more than twofold, compared to file systems without tail packing.

This not only translates into conservation of disk space, but may also introduce performance increases, as due to higher locality of reference, less data has to be read, also translating into higher page cache efficiency. However, these advantages can be negated by the increased complexity of implementation.

As of 2015, the most widely used read-write file systems with support for block suballocation are Btrfs and FreeBSD UFS2 (where it is called "block level fragmentation"). ReiserFS and Reiser4 also support tail packing.

Several read-only file systems do not use blocks at all and are thus implicitly using space as efficiently as suballocating file systems; such file systems double as archive formats.

== See also ==
- File system
- Internal fragmentation
- Locality of reference
- Comparison of file systems
