= OCFS2 =

Clustered file system

- Developer: Oracle Corporation
- Full name: Oracle Cluster file System
- Introduced: March 2006 with Linux 2.6.16

Limits
- Max volume size: 4 PB (OCFS2)
- Max file size: 4 PB (OCFS2)
- Max filename length: 255 bytes
- Allowed filename characters: All bytes except NUL and '/'

Features
- Dates recorded: modification (mtime), attribute modification (ctime), access (atime)
- File system permissions: Unix permissions, ACLs and arbitrary security attributes (Linux 2.6 and later)
- Transparent compression: No
- Transparent encryption: No
- Data deduplication: No
- Copy-on-write: Yes

Other
- Supported operating systems: Linux

The Oracle Cluster File System (OCFS, in its second version OCFS2) is a shared-disk file system developed by Oracle Corporation and released under the GNU General Public License. The first version of OCFS was developed with the main focus to accommodate Oracle's database management system that used cluster computing. Because of that it was not a POSIX-compliant file system. With version 2 the POSIX features were included.

OCFS2 (version 2) was integrated into the version 2.6.16 of Linux kernel. Initially, it was marked as "experimental" (Alpha-test) code. This restriction was removed in Linux version 2.6.19. With kernel version 2.6.29 in late 2008, more features were included into ocfs2, such as access control lists and quotas.

OCFS2 used a distributed lock manager which resembles the OpenVMS DLM but is much simpler. Oracle announced version 1.6 in November 2010 which included a copy on write feature called reflink.

== See also ==
- GlusterFS
- GFS2
- General Parallel File System (GPFS)
- List of file systems
- Lustre (file system)
- MooseFS
- QFS
