= Rémy Card =

French software developer

Rémy Card is a French software developer who is credited as one of the primary developers of the Extended file system (ext) and Second Extended file system (ext2) for Linux.

== Bibliography ==
- Card, Rémy. (1997) Programmation Linux 2.0. Gestion 2000. ISBN 84-8088-207-7.
- Card, Rémy; Dumas, Éric; & Mével, Franck. (1998). The Linux Kernel Book. John Wiley & Sons. ISBN 0-471-98141-9.
