= File change log =

A file change log tracks changes to the namespace (files and directories) of a file system. Depending on the implementation, a file change log in computing will record changes such as creates, links, unlinks (deletions), renamed files, data changes, and metadata changes (for example, ACLs and permissions). A file change log can be accessed as a file in the file system, or hidden and accessed only programmatically.

A file change log differs from a file system's journal.

== Purposes ==
Such a log can serve at least two purposes. First, some applications must scan an entire file system to discover changes since their last scan. By reading a file change log, they can avoid this scan. Scanning applications include backup utilities, web crawler, search engines, and replication programs. Second, the log can serve as an audit record for activity in a file system.

Some applications and software provide functionality to create a file change log. For example Adobe Acrobat 9 allows users to create a file change log for documents with Bates numbering which is typically used in the legal profession.

In cyber security it can be used for monitoring and to determine conflicts with compatibility issues.

The log is also used in accounting and business management to monitor bills, inventories and changes by individuals to these records.
