= QFS =

File system

- Full name: Quick File System

Limits
- Max file size: 8 EiB
- Max no. of files: 4.1 billion per filesystem

Other
- Supported operating systems: OpenSolaris; Linux (client only)

QFS (Quick File System) is a filesystem from Oracle. It is tightly integrated with SAM, the Storage and Archive Manager, and hence is often referred to as SAM-QFS. SAM provides the functionality of a hierarchical storage manager.

== Features ==
QFS supports some volume management capabilities, allowing many disks to be grouped together into a file system. File system metadata can be kept on a separate set of disks, which is useful for streaming applications where long disk seeks cannot be tolerated.

SAM extends the QFS file system transparently to archival storage. A SAM-QFS file system may have a relatively small (gigabytes to terabytes) "disk cache" backed by petabytes of tape or other bulk storage. Files are copied to archival storage in the background, and transparently retrieved to disk when accessed. SAM-QFS supports up to four archival copies, each of which can be on disk, tape, optical media, or may be stored at a remote site also running SAM-QFS.

Shared QFS adds a multi-writer global filesystem, allowing multiple machines to read from & write to the same disks concurrently through the use of multi-ported disks or a storage area network. (QFS also has a single-writer/multi-reader mode which can be used to share disks between hosts without the need for a network connection.)

== History ==
SAM-QFS was designed and implemented at Large Storage Systems (LSC). The lead architect of SAM-QFS was Harriet Coverston, the founder and VP of Technology at LSC. LSC and SAM-QFS were purchased by Sun in 2001. Sun released the SAM-QFS source code to the OpenSolaris project in March 2008. After Oracle acquired Sun, Oracle continued to develop the SAM-QFS product. Later Oracle renamed SAM-QFS to Oracle HSM (Oracle Hierarchical Storage Manager). In 2014 Versity, a storage startup co-founded by SAM-QFS lead architect Coverston, released the Versity Storage Manager (VSM), a Linux-based HSM based on the SAM-QFS code. Oracle announced 2019 the end of life to 2021, Versity shows an migration path.
