= MINIX file system =

Native file system of the Minix operating system

Minix file system
- Developer(s): Open source community
- Full name: MINIX file system version 3
- Introduced: 1987; 39 years ago with Minix 1.0
- Partition IDs: 0x81 (MBR)

Features
- Dates recorded: last metadata change, last file change, last file access
- Date resolution: 1s
- File system permissions: POSIX
- Transparent compression: No
- Transparent encryption: No (provided at the block device level)

Other
- Supported operating systems: Minix 3, Linux, MiNT, HelenOS and ELKS

The Minix file system is the native file system of the Minix operating system. It was written by Andrew S. Tanenbaum in the 1980s and aimed to replicate the structure of the Unix File System while omitting complex features, and was intended to be a teaching aid. It largely fell out of favour among Linux users by 1994 due to the popularity of other filesystems—most notably ext2—and its lack of features, including limited partition sizes and filename length limits.

== History ==
MINIX was written by Andrew S. Tanenbaum in the 1980s, as a Unix-like operating system whose source code could be used freely in education. The MINIX file system was designed for use with MINIX; it copies the basic structure of the Unix File System but avoids any complex features in the interest of keeping the source code clean, clear and simple, to meet the overall goal of MINIX to be a useful teaching aid.

When Linus Torvalds started writing his Linux operating system kernel (1991), he was working on a machine running MINIX, and adopted its file system layout. This soon proved problematic, since MINIX restricted filename lengths to 14 characters (30 in later versions), it limited partitions to 64 megabytes, and the file system was designed for teaching purposes, not performance. The Linux implementation of the MINIX file system was multi-threaded, whereas the MINIX implementation of the file system was single-threaded. The extended file system (ext; April 1992) was developed to replace MINIX's, but it was only with the second version of this, ext2, that Linux obtained a commercial-grade file system. As of 1994, the MINIX file system was "scarcely in use" among Linux users.

== Design and implementation ==
A MINIX file system has six components:

- The Boot Block, which is always stored in the first block. It contains the boot loader that loads and runs an operating system at system startup.
- The second block is the Superblock, which stores data about the file system, that allows the operating system to locate and understand other file system structures—for example, the number of inodes and zones, the size of the two bitmaps and the starting block of the data area.
- The inode bitmap is a simple map of the inodes that tracks which ones are in use and which ones are free by representing them as either a one (in use) or a zero (free).
- The zone bitmap works in the same way as the inode bitmap, except it tracks the zones.
- The inodes area. Each file or directory is represented as an inode, which records metadata including type (file, directory, block, char, pipe), IDs for user and group, three timestamps that record the date and time of last access, last modification and last status change. An inode also contains a list of addresses that point to the zones in the data area, where the file or directory data is stored.
- The data area is the largest component of the file system, using the majority of the space. It is where the file and directory data are stored.

== See also ==
- List of file systems
- MINIX 3
- Minix-vmd
