= Ext2Fsd =

Open source filesystem driver

- Original author: Matt Wu
- Developer: Matt Wu
- Release: January 26, 2002; 24 years ago
- Final release: 0.69 / November 2, 2017; 8 years ago
- Written in: C
- Operating system: Microsoft Windows
- Available in: English, Simplified Chinese
- Type: Installable File System
- License: GNU GPL v2
- Website: Archive of the original website
- Repository: github.com/matt-wu/Ext3Fsd

Ext2Fsd (short for Ext2 File System Driver) is a free Installable File System driver written in C for the Microsoft Windows operating system family. It facilitates read and write access to the ext2, ext3 and ext4 file systems.

The driver can be installed on Windows 2000, Windows XP, Windows Server 2003, Windows Vista, Windows 7, Windows 8, Windows 10, Windows Server 2008, Windows Server 2008 R2. Support for Windows NT was dropped in version 0.30.

The program Ext2Mgr can optionally be installed additionally to manage drive letters and such. Since the final release in 2017, no further updates have been made to Ext2Fsd. The official website succumbed to link rot in 2024.

== Reception ==
The German computer magazine PC-WELT reported frequent program crashes in 2009. The program was not able to access ext3 partitions smoothly. This often led to a blue screen. Crashes of this type can lead to data loss, for example if there is not yet permanently stored data in the main memory. The program could only access ext2 partitions without errors. In 2012, Computerwoche warned that access to ext3 partitions was "not harmless". Data loss may occur.

== Features ==
=== Feature matrix ===
	Read	Write	Journal	dir_index
ext2	Yes	Yes	—N/a	—N/a
ext3	Yes	Yes	Limited	Yes
ext4	Yes	Yes	Limited	Yes

=== Supported Ext3/4 features ===
- flexible inode size: > 128 bytes, up to block size
- dir_index: htree directory index
- filetype: extra file mode in dentry
- large_file: > 4G files supported
- sparse_super: super block backup in group descriptor
- uninit_bg: fast fsck and group checksum
- extent: full support with extending and shrinking.
- journal: only support replay for internal journal
- flex_bg: first flexible metadata group
- symlink and hardlink
- Mount-as-user: specified uid/gid supported

=== Unsupported Ext3/4 features ===
- 64BIT mode (to support 2^64 blocks)
- journal: log-based operations, external journal
- Extended file attributes (EA), Access control list (ACL) support

=== Features to be implemented in future ===
- Extents management improvement
- EA and ACL security checking

== Critical Bug ==
On November 2, 2017, a warning was issued with the release of version 0.69:

Don't use Ext2Fsd 0.68 or earlier versions with latest Ubuntu or Debian systems. Ext2Fsd 0.68 cannot process EXT4 with 64-BIT mode enabled, then it could corrupt your data. Very sorry for this disaster issue, I'm working on an improvement.

While it is not very clear whether v0.69 corrects this deficiency, users have reported that Windows 10 prompts them to format the ext4 drive even with the 0.69 version. The known solution is to convert the said ext4 drive to a 32 bit version.

== See also ==
- Ext2IFS
- GParted
- GNOME Disks
- dm-crypt
- FreeOTFE
