= List of default file systems =

Default file system used in various operating systems.

Release year	Operating system	File system
1968	George 3	George 3
1971	OS/8	DECtape / OS/8
1972	RSX-11	ODS-1
1974	CP/M	CP/M file system
1980	86-DOS	FAT12, but logically format incompatible with MS-DOS/PC DOS.
1981	PC DOS 1.0	FAT12
1982	MS-DOS 1.25	FAT12
1982	Commodore 64, 1541	Commodore DOS (CBM DOS)
1984	PC DOS 3.0, MS-DOS 3.0	FAT16
1984	Classic Mac OS	Macintosh File System (MFS)
1985	Atari TOS	Modified FAT12
1985	Classic Mac OS	Hierarchical File System (HFS)
1987	Compaq MS-DOS 3.31	FAT16B
1988	AmigaOS v1.3	Amiga Fast File System (FFS)
1989	OS/2 v1.2	High Performance File System (HPFS)
1989	SCO UNIX	HTFS
1990	Windows 3.0, 3.1x	FAT16B
1993	Slackware	ext2
1993	Debian GNU/Linux	ext2
1993	FreeBSD v1-v5.0	UFS1
1993	Windows NT 3.1	NTFS 1.0
1994	Windows NT 3.5	NTFS 1.1
1995	Windows 95	FAT16B with VFAT
1996	Windows NT 4.0	NTFS 1.2
1998	Mac OS 8.1, macOS	HFS Plus (HFS+)
1998	Windows 98	FAT32 with VFAT
2000	SUSE Linux Enterprise 6.4	ReiserFS
2000	Windows Me	FAT32 with VFAT
2000	Windows 2000	NTFS 3.0
2000	Ututo GNU/Linux	ext4
2000	Knoppix	ext3
2000	Red Hat Linux	ext3
2001	Windows XP	NTFS 3.1 but FAT32 was also common
2002	Arch Linux	ext4
2002	Gentoo Linux	ext4
2003	FreeBSD v5.1-v9	UFS2
2003	Windows Server 2003	NTFS 3.1
2003	Fedora Core 1	ext3
2004	Ubuntu 4.10	ext3
2004	OpenWrt	OverlayFS combining SquashFS + JFFS2
2004	CentOS 3	ext3
2005	Debian GNU/Linux 3.1	ext3
2005	dyne	SquashFS
2006	OpenDOS 7.01.08	FAT32+
2006	gNewSense	ext4
2006	Windows Vista	NTFS 3.1
2006	SUSE Linux Enterprise 11 openSUSE 10.2	ext3
2007	Slackware 12	ext3
2007	Trisquel	ext4
2008	Windows Server 2008	NTFS 3.1
2008	Musix GNU+Linux	ext4
2008	Nexenta OS	ZFS
2009	Windows 7	NTFS 3.1
2009	Parabola GNU/Linux-libre	ext4
2009	openSUSE 11	ext4
2009	Slackware 13	ext4
2009	Ubuntu 9.10	ext4
2009	Fedora 11	ext4
2010	LibreWRT	SquashFS
2011	CentOS 6	ext4
2011	Debian GNU/kFreeBSD	UFS1
2011	Arch Hurd	ext2
2012	Windows 8	NTFS 3.1
2013	Debian GNU/Linux 7.0	ext4
2013	Debian GNU/Hurd	ext2
2014	libreCMC	OverlayFS combining SquashFS + JFFS2
2014	RHEL 7	XFS
2014	CentOS 7	XFS
2015	Windows 10	NTFS 3.1
2015	Fedora 22	Combination: ext4 (Fedora Workstation and Cloud), XFS (Fedora Server)
2015	openSUSE 42.1	Combination: Btrfs (for system) and XFS (for home)
2016	iOS 10.3	APFS
2017	macOS High Sierra (10.13)	APFS
2020	Fedora 33	Btrfs (Fedora Workstation)
2021	Windows 11	NTFS 3.1
2021	Rocky Linux 8	XFS
2021	AlmaLinux 8	XFS
2024	openSUSE Leap 15.6	Btrfs

== See also ==
- List of file systems
- Comparison of file systems
- List of partition IDs (MBR)
- Master Boot Record (MBR)
- GUID Partition Table (GPT)
- Apple Partition Map
- Amiga Rigid Disk Block
- Timeline of DOS operating systems
- History of Microsoft Windows
- FDISK
