= Vfs acl xattr =

Experimental module in the Samba software

vfs_acl_xattr is an experimental VFS-module of Samba.

It stores NTFS Access-Control List (ACLs) in Extended Attributes (EAs), in addition to storing them in Unix ACLs. This improves compatibility with Windows ACLs, because it allows to store all flags that can be used in Windows ACLs.
