= Network redirector =

In DOS and Windows, a network redirector, or redirector, is an operating system driver that sends data to and receives data from a remote device. A network redirector provides mechanisms to locate, open, read, write, and delete files and submit print jobs.

The network redirector was first implemented in MS-DOS 3.1 in 1984.

It provides application services such as named pipes and MailSlots. When an application needs to send or receive data from a remote device, it sends a call to the redirector. The redirector provides the functionality of the presentation layer of the OSI model.

Networks Hosts communicate through use of this client software: Shells, Redirectors and Requesters.

In Microsoft Networking, the network redirectors are implemented as Installable File System (IFS) drivers.

== See also ==
- Universal Naming Convention (UNC)
