= XFS =

Journaling file system for IRIX and Linux

- Developers: Silicon Graphics; Red Hat
- Full name: XFS
- Introduced: 1994; 32 years ago with IRIX 5.3
- Partition IDs: MBR: 0x83: Linux filesystem; GPT: 0FC63DAF-8483-4772-8E79-3D69D8477DE4: Linux filesystem

Structures
- Directory contents: B+ trees
- File allocation: B+ trees

Limits
- Max volume size: 8 exbibytes − 1 byte
- Max file size: 8 exbibytes − 1 byte
- Max no. of files: 2^{64}
- Max filename length: 255 bytes
- Allowed filename characters: All except NUL and "/"

Features
- Dates recorded: atime, mtime, ctime, version 5: crtime
- Date range: December 13, 1901 – July 2, 2486
- Date resolution: 1 ns
- Attributes: Yes
- File system permissions: Yes
- Transparent compression: No
- Transparent encryption: No (provided at the block device level)
- Data deduplication: Experimental, Linux only
- Copy-on-write: Yes

Other
- Supported operating systems: IRIX; Linux

XFS is a high-performance 64-bit journaling file system created by Silicon Graphics, Inc (SGI) in 1993. It was the default file system in SGI's IRIX operating system starting with its version 5.3. XFS was ported to the Linux kernel in 2001; as of June 2014, XFS is supported by most Linux distributions. Red Hat Enterprise Linux uses it as its default file system.

XFS excels in the execution of parallel input/output (I/O) operations due to its design, which is based on allocation groups (a type of subdivision of the physical volumes in which XFS is used – also shortened to AGs). Because of this, XFS enables extreme scalability of I/O threads, file system bandwidth, and size of files and of the file system itself when spanning multiple physical storage devices. XFS ensures the consistency of data by employing metadata journaling and supporting write barriers. Space allocation is performed via extents with data structures stored in B+ trees, improving the overall performance of the file system, especially when handling large files. Delayed allocation assists in the prevention of file system fragmentation; online defragmentation is also supported.

== History ==
Silicon Graphics began development of XFS ("X" was meant to be filled in later but never was) in 1993 for its UNIX System V based IRIX operating system. The file system was released under the GNU General Public License (GPL) in May 1999.

A team led by Steve Lord at SGI ported XFS to Linux, and first support by a Linux distribution came in 2001. This support gradually became available in almost all Linux distributions.

Initial support for XFS in the Linux kernel came through patches from SGI. It merged into the Linux kernel mainline for the 2.6 series, and separately merged in February 2004 into the 2.4 series in version 2.4.25, making XFS almost universally available on Linux systems. Gentoo Linux became the first Linux distribution to introduce an option for XFS as the default filesystem in mid-2002.

FreeBSD added read-only support for XFS in December 2005, and in June 2006 introduced experimental write support. However, this was intended only as an aid in migration from Linux, not as a "main" file system. FreeBSD 10 removed support for XFS.

In 2009, version 5.4 of 64-bit Red Hat Enterprise Linux (RHEL) Linux distribution contained the necessary kernel support for the creation and usage of XFS file systems, but lacked the corresponding command-line tools. The tools available from CentOS could operate for that purpose, and Red Hat also provided them to RHEL customers on request. RHEL 6.0, released in 2010, includes XFS support for a fee as part of Red Hat's "scalable file system add-on". Oracle Linux 6, released in 2011, also includes an option for using XFS.

RHEL 7.0, released in June 2014, uses XFS as its default file system, including support for using XFS for the /boot partition, which previously was not practical due to bugs in the GRUB bootloader.

Linux kernel 4.8 in August 2016 added a new feature, "reverse mapping". This is the foundation for a large set of planned features: snapshots, copy-on-write (COW) data, data deduplication, reflink copies, online data and metadata scrubbing, highly accurate reporting of data loss or bad sectors, and significantly improved reconstruction of damaged or corrupted filesystems. This work required changes to XFS's on-disk format.

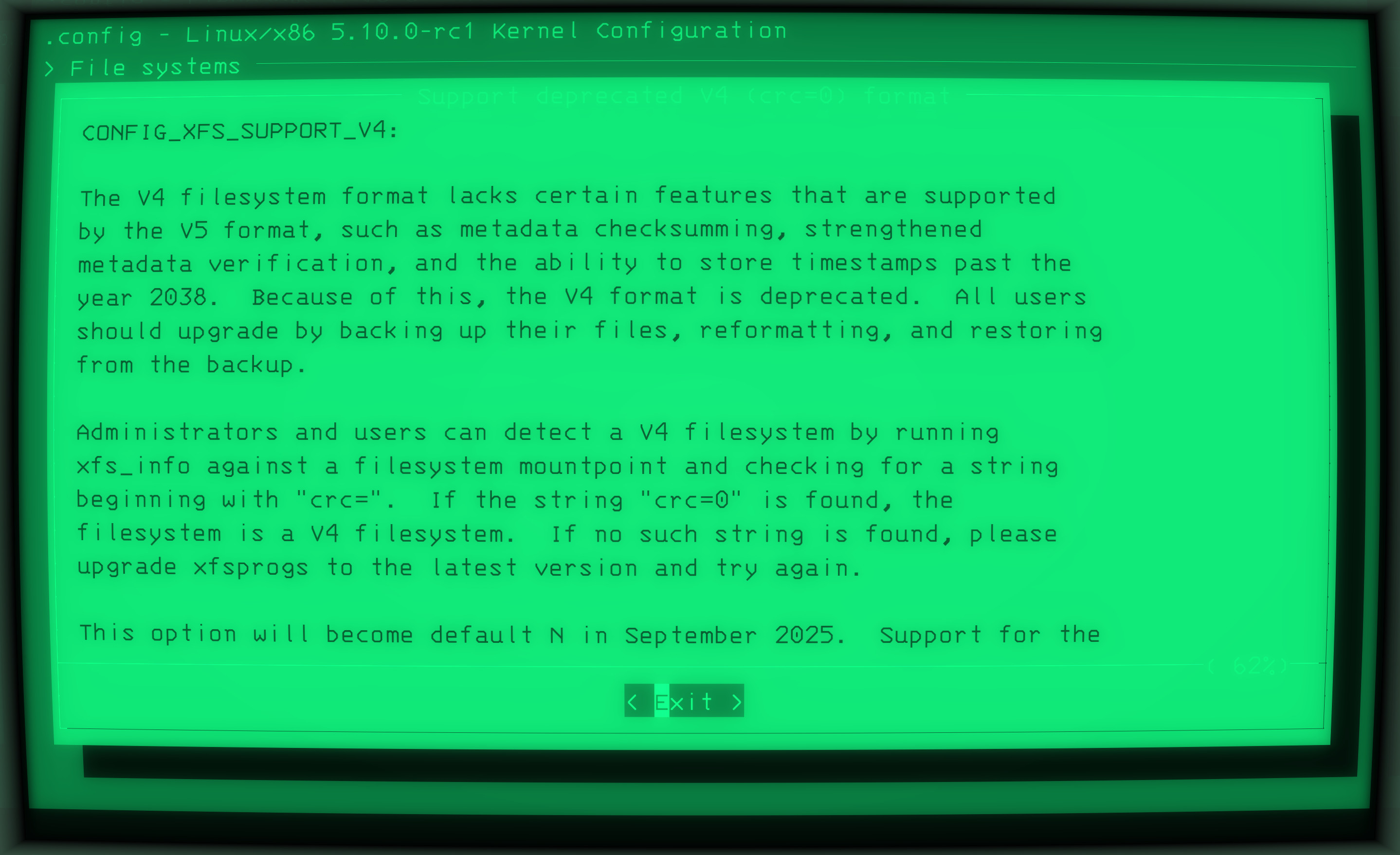
XFS v4 is deprecated. Partitions have to be reformatted with XFS v5.

Linux kernel 5.10, released in December 2020, included the new on-disk format XFS v5. This was a hard break, since the deprecated XFS v4 can not be converted to XFS v5. Data on partitions formatted with XFS v4 has to be backed up to another partition or media in order to restore it after formatting the old partition with XFS v5, which completely wipes all data on it. The support for XFS v4 will be removed from the Linux kernel in September 2030.

XFS v5 introduced "bigtime", to store inode timestamps as a 64-bit nanosecond counter instead of the traditional 32-bit seconds counter. This postpones the previous Year 2038 problem until the year 2486. It also introduced metadata checksums.

The Gentoo Handbook, Gentoo Linux's official installation manual, has recommended XFS as the "all-purpose all-platform filesystem" since June 28, 2023, succeeding Ext4.

== Features ==
=== Capacity ===
XFS is a 64-bit file system and supports a maximum file system size of 8 exbibytes minus one byte (2^{63} − 1 bytes), but limitations imposed by the host operating system can decrease this limit. 32-bit Linux systems limit the size of both the file and file system to 16 tebibytes.

=== Journaling ===
In modern computing, journaling is a capability which ensures consistency of data in the file system, despite any power outages or system crash that may occur. XFS provides journaling for file system metadata, where file system updates are first written to a serial journal before the actual disk blocks are updated. The journal is a circular buffer of disk blocks that is not read in normal file system operation.

The XFS journal can be stored within the data section of the file system (as an internal log), or on a separate device to minimize disk contention.

In XFS, the journal primarily contains entries that describe the portions of the disk blocks changed by filesystem operations. Journal updates are performed asynchronously to avoid a decrease in performance speed.

In the event of a system crash, file system operations which occurred immediately prior to the crash can be reapplied and completed as recorded in the journal, which is how data stored in XFS file systems remain consistent. Recovery is performed automatically the first time the file system is mounted after the crash. The speed of recovery is independent of the size of the file system, instead depending on the amount of file system operations to be reapplied.

=== Allocation groups ===
XFS file systems are internally partitioned into allocation groups, which are equally sized linear regions within the file system. Files and directories can span allocation groups. Each allocation group manages its own inodes and free space separately, providing scalability and parallelism so multiple threads and processes can perform I/O operations on the same file system simultaneously.

This architecture helps to optimize parallel I/O performance on systems with multiple processors and/or cores, as metadata updates can also be parallelized. The internal partitioning provided by allocation groups can be especially beneficial when the file system spans multiple physical devices, allowing optimal usage of throughput of the underlying storage components.

=== Striped allocation ===
If an XFS file system is to be created on a striped RAID array, a stripe unit can be specified when the file system is created. This maximizes throughput by ensuring that data allocations, inode allocations and the internal log (the journal) are aligned with the stripe unit.

=== Extent-based allocation ===
Blocks used in files stored on XFS file systems are managed with variable length extents where one extent describes one or more contiguous blocks. This can shorten the list of blocks considerably, compared to file systems that list all blocks used by a file individually.

Block-oriented file systems manage space allocation with one or more block-oriented bitmaps; in XFS, these structures are replaced with an extent oriented structure consisting of a pair of B+ trees for each file system allocation group. One of the B+ trees is indexed by the length of the free extents, while the other is indexed by the starting block of the free extents. This dual indexing scheme allows for the highly efficient allocation of free extents for file system operations.

=== Variable block sizes ===
The file system block size represents the minimum allocation unit. XFS allows file systems to be created with block sizes ranging between 512 bytes and 64 KB, allowing the file system to be tuned for the expected degree of usage. When many small files are expected, a small block size would typically maximize capacity, but for a system dealing mainly with large files, a larger block size can provide a performance efficiency advantage.

=== Delayed allocation ===
XFS makes use of lazy evaluation techniques for file allocation. When a file is written to the buffer cache, rather than allocating extents for the data, XFS simply reserves the appropriate number of file system blocks for the data held in memory. The actual block allocation occurs only when the data is finally flushed to disk. This improves the chance that the file will be written in a contiguous group of blocks, reducing fragmentation problems and increasing performance.

=== Sparse files ===
XFS provides a 64-bit sparse address space for each file, which allows both for very large file sizes, and for "holes" within files in which no disk space is allocated. As the file system uses an extent map for each file, the file allocation map size is kept small. Where the size of the allocation map is too large for it to be stored within the inode, the map is moved into a B+ tree which allows for rapid access to data anywhere in the 64-bit address space provided for the file.

=== Extended attributes ===
XFS provides multiple data streams for files; this is made possible by its implementation of extended attributes. These allow the storage of a number of name/value pairs attached to a file. Names are nul-terminated printable character strings which are up to 256 bytes in length, while their associated values can contain up to 64 KB of binary data.

They are further subdivided into two namespaces: root and user. Extended attributes stored in the root namespace can be modified only by the superuser, while attributes in the user namespace can be modified by any user with permission to write to the file.

Extended attributes can be attached to any kind of XFS inode, including symbolic links, device nodes, directories, etc. The attr utility can be used to manipulate extended attributes from the command line, and the xfsdump and xfsrestore utilities are aware of extended attributes, and will back up and restore their contents. Many other backup systems do not support working with extended attributes.

=== Direct I/O ===
For applications requiring high throughput to disk, XFS provides a direct I/O implementation that allows non-cached I/O operations to be applied directly to the userspace. Data is transferred between the buffer of the application and the disk using DMA, which allows access to the full I/O bandwidth of the underlying disk devices.

=== Snapshots ===
XFS does not yet provide direct support for snapshots, as it currently expects the snapshot process to be implemented by the volume manager. Taking a snapshot of an XFS filesystem involves temporarily halting I/O to the filesystem using the xfs_freeze utility, having the volume manager perform the actual snapshot, and then resuming I/O to continue with normal operations. The snapshot can then be mounted read-only for backup purposes.

Releases of XFS in IRIX incorporated an integrated volume manager called XLV. This volume manager has not been ported to Linux, and XFS works with standard LVM in Linux systems instead.

In recent Linux kernels, the xfs_freeze functionality is implemented in the VFS layer, and is executed automatically when the Volume Manager's snapshot functionality is invoked. This was once a valuable advantage as the ext3 file system could not be suspended and the volume manager was unable to create a consistent "hot" snapshot to back up a heavily busy database. Fortunately this is no longer the case. Since Linux 2.6.29, the file systems ext3, ext4, GFS2 and JFS have the freeze feature as well.

=== Online defragmentation ===
Although the extent-based nature of XFS and the delayed allocation strategy it uses significantly improves the file system's resistance to fragmentation problems, XFS provides a filesystem defragmentation utility (xfs_fsr, short for XFS filesystem reorganizer) that can defragment the files on a mounted and active XFS filesystem.

=== Online growth ===
XFS provides the xfs_growfs utility to perform online expansion of XFS file systems. XFS filesystems can be grown so long as there is remaining unallocated space on the device holding the filesystem. This feature is typically used in conjunction with volume management, as otherwise the partition holding the filesystem will need enlarging separately.

=== Realtime device ===
XFS supports a separate device called the realtime device, which uses a simple deterministic bitmap allocator instead of the more scalable but more complex B+ tree based allocator normally used in XFS. The realtime device was originally added to support Guaranteed-rate I/O, but acquired other uses later. Today the most common usage is to place metadata on an SSDs while placing data on a hard drive.

=== Data block sharing using reflinks ===
In Linux 4.9, XFS added support for sharing identifical blocks between files, which provides a fast way to clone files and to allower userspace tools to implement out of line Data deduplication. The reflink support is implemented using a new per-allocation group B+ tree tracking the number of references for each physical block, and changes to the write path to perform Copy-on-write when overwriting blocks with an elevated block count.

=== Online file system check and autonomous self-healing ===
As of Linux 6.10, XFS supports online file system checking and repair for all metadata. To support efficient rebuilds of the freespace tracking data structures, a reverse mapping (rmap) B+tree was added, and to provide redundant metadata for the file hierarchy, parent pointers that are stored as extended attributes were added as well. As of Linux 7.0, XFS support autonomous self-healing based on these features, with the xfs_healer program automatically initiating repair action as needed.

=== Zoned XFS ===
Linux 6.15 added a new zoned allocator to support Zoned Storage, including hard drives using shingled-magnetic recording (SMR) and NVM Express SSDs using the zoned command set. The zoned allocator works on the realtime device and only stores file data. Metadata uses the existing XFS allocator on the main device. To support SMR hard drives without conventional zones, zoned XFS adds support for an internal RT device, where the main and RT devices sit on the same Linux block device. The zoned allocator always writes out of place, and always writes sequentially in a limited number of open zones, and garbage collection is performed to evacuate valid blocks in partially used zones to create free zones used for further writes. Zoned XFS can use multiple open zones and performs intelligent data placement, leading to better performance than other file systems on zoned storage, and even beating conventional file systems on regular SSDs for some use cases.

=== IRIX-only features ===
==== DMAPI ====
XFS implemented the DMAPI interface to support Hierarchical Storage Management in IRIX. As of October 2010, the Linux implementation of XFS supported the required on-disk metadata for DMAPI implementation, but the kernel support was reportedly not usable. For some time, SGI hosted a kernel tree which included the DMAPI hooks, but this support has not been adequately maintained, although kernel developers have stated an intention to bring this support up to date.

==== Guaranteed-rate I/O ====
The XFS guaranteed-rate I/O system provides an API that allows applications to reserve bandwidth to the filesystem. XFS dynamically calculates the performance available from the underlying storage devices, and will reserve bandwidth sufficient to meet the requested performance for a specified time. This is a feature unique to the XFS file system. Guaranteed rates can be "hard" or "soft", representing a trade off between reliability and performance; however, XFS will only allow "hard" guarantees if the underlying storage subsystem supports it. This facility is used mostly for real-time applications, such as video streaming.

Guaranteed-rate I/O was only supported under IRIX, and required special hardware for that purpose.

==== Linux and IRIX Interoperability ====
The XFS Linux port started with the IRIX code base, and the feature flag encoding is compatible between both versions. However, the set of supported features differs. Additionally, the log is always written in native endian, and Linux cannot recover a dirty log written by IRIX and vice versa, even Linux is used on a big endian CPU.

Linux never fully supported the v1 directory format used in older IRIX releases, and support for v1 directories was fully removed in Linux 6.18. Starting with version 6.5.5, IRIX added support for v2 directories, but the option only became the default by IRIX 6.5.14. The newer v3 directories used by Linux are not supported on IRIX.

== Disadvantages ==
- XFS filesystems cannot (as of December 2023) be shrunk in place, although several possible workarounds have been discussed.
- Journaling cannot be disabled. However, XFS can write to an external journal on a separate block device instead.

=== Historic disadvantages ===
- Metadata operations in XFS were slower compared to journaling file systems implemented later and designed to work with much larger logs resulting in, for example, slower performance with operations such as deletions of large numbers of files. However, a new XFS feature implemented by Dave Chinner and called delayed logging, available since version 2.6.39 of the Linux kernel mainline, is said to resolve this; performance benchmarks done by the developer in 2010 revealed performance levels to be similar to ext4 at low thread counts, and superior at high thread counts.

== See also ==
- Comparison of file systems
- List of file systems
- List of default file systems
- Stratis (configuration daemon)
