= Theodore Ts'o =

American computer scientist, free software developer

Theodore Yue Tak Ts'o
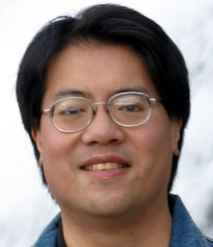
- Ted Ts'o in 2003.
- Born: 1968 (age 57–58); Palo Alto, California
- Other name: Ted
- Education: Massachusetts Institute of Technology
- Occupations: Computer scientist, free software developer
- Employer: Google
- Known for: Involvement in FOSS, e2fsprogs
- Awards: Award for the Advancement of Free Software
- Website: Official website

Theodore Yue Tak Ts'o (Chinese: 曹子德; born 1968) is an American software engineer mainly known for his contributions to the Linux kernel, in particular his contributions to file systems. He is the secondary developer and maintainer of e2fsprogs, the userspace utilities for the ext2, ext3, and ext4 filesystems, and is a maintainer for the ext4 file system.

== Biography ==
Ts'o graduated from MIT with a degree in computer science in 1990, after which he worked in MIT's Information Systems (IS) department until 1999. During this time he was project leader of the Kerberos team.

In 1994, Ts'o created the /dev/random Linux device node and the corresponding kernel driver, which was Linux's (and Unix's) first kernel interface that provided high-quality cryptographic random numbers to user programs. /dev/random works without access to a hardware random number generator, allowing user programs to depend upon its existence. Separate daemons such as rngd take random numbers from such hardware and make them accessible via /dev/random. Since its creation, interface /dev/random is used in Linux, FreeBSD, macOS, and Solaris systems.

After MIT IS, Ts'o went to work for VA Linux Systems for two years. In late 2001 he joined IBM, where he worked on improvements in the Linux kernel's performance and scalability. After working on a real-time kernel at IBM, Ts'o joined the Linux Foundation in late 2007 for a two-year fellowship. He initially served as Chief Platform Strategist, before becoming Chief Technology Officer in 2008. Ts'o also served as Treasurer for USENIX until 2008, and has chaired the annual Linux Kernel Developers Summit.

In 2010 Ts'o moved to Google, saying he would be working on "kernel, file system, and storage stuff".

Ts'o is a Debian Developer, maintaining several packages, mostly filesystem-related ones, including e2fsprogs since March 2003. He was a member of the Security Area Directorate for the Internet Engineering Task Force, and was one of the chairs for the IPsec working group. He was one of the founding board members for the Free Standards Group.

In July 2023, Ts'o joined RESF's Board of Directors, which encompasses the Rocky Linux project.

== Awards ==
Ts'o was awarded the Free Software Foundation's 2006 Award for the Advancement of Free Software.
