= Installable File System =

Filesystem API

The Installable File System (IFS) is a filesystem API in MS-DOS/PC DOS 4.x, IBM OS/2 and Microsoft Windows that enables the operating system to recognize and load drivers for file systems.

== History ==
When IBM and Microsoft were co-developing OS/2, they realized that the FAT file system did not offer some of the features modern OSes would require, and Microsoft began developing the High Performance File System (HPFS), codenamed Pinball.

Instead of coding it inside the kernel, as FAT was, Microsoft developed a "driver-based" filesystem API that could allow them and other developers to add new filesystems to the kernel without needing to modify it.

When Microsoft stopped working on OS/2, IBM continued using the IFS interface and Microsoft implemented a similar one in Windows NT.

== Implementations ==
=== Additional file systems in DOS ===
The IFS framework was never implemented in DOS. To provide additional filesystems on top of FAT, like MSCDEX adds ISO 9660 to read CD-ROMs, the network redirector was used instead.

=== IFS in OS/2 ===
The IFS provided a basic interface for programming filesystems. It was introduced in 1989 in OS/2 1.20, along with the HPFS filesystem.

Filesystem drivers executed in kernel-space (ring 0) and are divided in four principal pieces: microIFS, miniIFS, IFS, helpers.

Only the IFS and the filesystem code itself is required, and it is loaded via an "IFS=" statement in the CONFIG.SYS file. It is an NE 16-bit dynamically loaded library. No matter if it is a 32-bit OS/2 (2.0 and newer), the IFS is always 16-bit (although unofficially you can make a 32-bit IFS).

The microIFS is a piece of code that loads in memory the kernel and the miniIFS and jumps to kernel execution. It is usually in the boot portion of the filesystem.

The miniIFS is a piece of code that is called by the kernel to load the first IFS statement that appears in the CONFIG.SYS file, so the first IFS statement must be the boot's filesystem for the system to be able to boot.

The helpers are 16-bit (for OS/2 1.x) or 32-bit (for OS/2 2.x and up), are executed in user-space (ring 3) and contain the code used for typical filesystem maintenance, and are called by CHKDSK and FORMAT utilities.

This four-piece scheme allowed developers to dynamically add a new bootable filesystem, as the ext2 driver for OS/2 demonstrated.

CD-ROM filesystem driver (ISO 9660) was added in OS/2 2.0, UDF was added in OS/2 4.0 and JFS was added in OS/2 4.5. ArcaOS, the latest packaging of OS/2, has a number of filesystem drivers available, including FAT32. There was also an official 32-bit HPFS IFS, called HPFS386 that improved performance and added some features, like variable size cache and Access Control Lists, and was available only in certain OS/2 server editions. The FAT filesystem was never removed from the kernel and officially never an IFS, although there are FAT IFS that added features like long file names (LFNs), FAT32 support, etc.

Network file-sharing protocols like NFS and SMB are also implemented using IFS, and the IFS interface never changed.

=== IFS in Windows 3.11 and 9x ===
IFSHLP.SYS (the Installable File System Helper) is an MS-DOS device driver that was first released as part of Microsoft Windows for Workgroups 3.11. It enables native 32-bit file access in Windows 386 Enhanced Mode by bypassing the 16-bit DOS API and ensuring that no other real mode driver intercepts INT 21h calls.

The protected mode counterpart of IFSHLP.SYS is IFSMGR.386 in Windows 3.11 and IFSMGR.VXD in Windows 95 and Windows 98.

=== IFS in Windows NT ===
The IFS API is part of the Windows Driver Kit.

When Microsoft stopped developing OS/2 and concentrated on what was then called OS/2 NT, they took the IFS ideas with it, along with the HPFS filesystem.

Instead of being a four-piece scheme, NT IFS was redesigned into a two-piece scheme. microIFS and miniIFS were removed from the scheme. IFS and helpers remain as the same, but later, in Windows NT 4.0, a defragmentation helper (DEFRAG) was added. Microsoft's original NTLDR was coded for loading the NT kernel from FAT, HPFS or NTFS, but subsequent versions dropped HPFS support. All of the drivers and helpers became 32-bit PE executables. The FAT file system was moved out of the Kernel to an IFS and was heavily optimized for performance, taking advantage of the 32-bit processing capabilities (being called FASTFAT).

Original Windows NT 3.1 incorporated FAT, HPFS (Pinball) and the newly created NTFS drivers, along with a new and improved CD-ROM filesystem driver that incorporated long file names using the Microsoft Joliet filesystem.

Windows NT 3.51 added per-file compression to NTFS and to the IFS interface. In Windows NT 4.0 HPFS was removed. In Windows 2000 FASTFAT was updated to support FAT32 and UDF was added.

Windows 2000 modified the IFS interface to add per-file encryption.

Network file-sharing protocols and antivirus are also implemented using IFS 'file system filter' drivers which intercept file I/O operations.

Apple started including read only HFS+ drivers in Mac OS X 10.6's version of Boot Camp for use in Windows XP, Windows Vista, and Windows 7.

== See also ==
- Virtual file system
- List of file systems
- Comparison of file systems
- Network redirector
- Dokan Library
