= JFFS2 =

Log-structured file system for flash memory devices

- Developer: David Woodhouse
- Full name: Journalling Flash File System version 2
- Introduced: September 23, 2001 with Linux 2.4.10

Features
- Transparent compression: zlib, rubin and rtime

Other
- Supported operating systems: Linux

Journalling Flash File System version 2 or JFFS2 is a log-structured file system for use with flash memory devices. It is the successor to JFFS. JFFS2 has been included into the Linux kernel since September 23, 2001, when it was merged into the Linux kernel mainline as part of the kernel version 2.4.10 release. JFFS2 is also available for a few bootloaders, like Das U-Boot, Open Firmware, the eCos RTOS, the RTEMS RTOS, and the RedBoot. Most prominent usage of the JFFS2 comes from OpenWrt.

At least three file systems have been developed as JFFS2 replacements: LogFS, UBIFS, and YAFFS.

== Features ==
JFFS2 introduced:

- Support for NAND flash devices. This involved a considerable amount of work as NAND devices have a sequential I/O interface and cannot be memory-mapped for reading.
- Hard links. This was not possible in JFFS because of limitations in the on-disk format.
- Compression. Five algorithms are available: zlib, rubin, lzma, rtime, and lzo.
- Better performance. JFFS treated the disk as a purely circular log. This generated a great deal of unnecessary I/O. The garbage collection algorithm in JFFS2 makes this mostly unnecessary.

== Design ==
As with JFFS, changes to files and directories are "logged" to flash in nodes, of which there are two types:

- inodes: a header with file metadata, followed by a payload of file data (if any). Compressed payloads are limited to one page.
- dirent nodes: directory entries each holding a name and an inode number. Hard links are represented as different names with the same inode number. The special inode number 0 represents an unlink.

As with JFFS, nodes start out as valid when they are created, and become obsolete when a newer version has been created elsewhere.

Unlike JFFS, however, there is no circular log. Instead, JFFS2 deals in blocks, a unit the same size as the erase segment of the flash medium. Blocks are filled, one at a time, with nodes from bottom up. A clean block is one that contains only valid nodes. A dirty block contains at least one obsolete node. A free block contains no nodes.

The garbage collector runs in the background, turning dirty blocks into free blocks. It does this by copying valid nodes to a new block and skipping obsolete ones. That done, it erases the dirty block and tags it with a special marker designating it as a free block (to prevent confusion if power is lost during an erase operation).

To make wear-levelling more even and prevent erasures from being too concentrated on mostly-static file systems, the garbage collector will occasionally also consume clean blocks.

== Disadvantages ==
Due to its log-structured design, JFFS2's disadvantages include the following:

- All nodes must still be scanned at mount time. This is slow and is becoming an increasingly serious problem as flash devices scale upward into the terabyte range. To overcome this issue, the Erase Block Summary (EBS) was introduced in version 2.6.15 of the Linux kernel. EBS is placed at the end of each block and updated upon each write to the block, summarizing the block's content; during mounts, EBS is read instead of scanning whole blocks.
- Writing many small blocks of data can even lead to negative compression rates, so it is essential for applications to use large write buffers.
- There is no practical way to tell how much usable free space is left on a device since this depends both on how well additional data can be compressed, and the writing sequence.

== See also ==
- List of file systems
- UBIFS
- NILFS
- F2FS
