= Overprovisioning =

Computing term, providing excess resources for performance

Overprovisioning is the technique of committing more of some resource than strictly necessary, in order to improve the performance or reliability of an engineered system. In specific contexts, overprovisioning can describe:

== Network engineering ==
Computer networks can be designed to allocate additional bandwidth in Network planning and design § Dimensioning.

== Computer data storage ==
Storage devices may contain more physical storage space than their advertised capacity, reserving the additional capacity to improve the device's performance or endurance characteristics. For example, solid-state drives allocate a reserve for wear leveling to mitigate write amplification.
