= JFS =

JFS may refer to:

== Computing ==
- JavaServer Faces, Java web application framework
- Journaling file system, a type of file system
- JFS (file system), a journaling file system by IBM
- Veritas File System, another journaling file system called JFS and OnlineJFS in HP-UX

== Organisations ==
- Jabhat Fateh al-Sham, a Salafist jihadist rebel group fighting in the Syrian Civil War
- Jewish Family Services, former name of the Jewish Board of Family and Children's Services
- John Fishwick & Sons, an English bus company
- JFS (school), a Jewish secondary school in North London, England
- The John Fisher School, a Catholic school in Purley, Surrey, England

== People ==
- John Flammang Schrank, a German-American tavern owner who attempted to assassinate former US President Theodore Roosevelt in 1912

== Publications ==
- Journal of Food Science
- Journal of Forensic Sciences
- Journal of Futures Studies

== Machines ==
- Jet fuel starter, device that provides energy for functions other than propulsion.

== See also ==
- JFFS, a journaling file system
