= JFFS =

Log-structured file system

- Developer: Axis Communications
- Full name: Journaling Flash File System
- Introduced: 2000; 26 years ago

Other
- Supported operating systems: Linux

The Journaling Flash File System (or JFFS) is a log-structured file system for use on NOR flash memory devices on the Linux operating system. It has been superseded by JFFS2.

== Design ==
JFFS was originally developed in 2000 by Björn Wesén at Axis Communications.

Flash memory (specifically NOR flash) must be erased prior to writing. The erase process has several limitations:

- Erasing is very slow (typically 1–100 ms per erase block, which is 10^{3}–10^{5} times slower than reading data from the same region).
- It is only possible to erase flash in large segments (usually 64 KiB or more), whereas it can be read or written in smaller blocks (often 512 bytes).
- Flash memory can only be erased a limited number of times (typically 10^{3}–10^{6}) before it becomes worn out.

These constraints combine to produce a profound asymmetry between patterns of read and write access to flash memory. In contrast, magnetic hard disk drives offer nearly symmetrical read and write access: read speed and write speed are nearly identical (as both are constrained by the rate at which the disk spins), it is possible to both read and write small blocks or sectors (typically 512 or 4096 bytes), and there is no practical limit to the number of times magnetic media can be written and rewritten.

Traditional file systems, such as ext2 or FAT which were designed for use on magnetic media typically update their data structures in-place, with data structures like inodes and directories updated on-disk after every modification. This concentrated lack of wear-levelling makes conventional file systems unsuitable for read-write use on flash devices.

JFFS enforces wear levelling by treating the flash device as a circular log. All changes to files and directories are written to the tail of the log in nodes. In each node, a header containing metadata is written first, followed by file data, if any. Nodes are chained together with offset pointers in the header. Nodes start out as valid and then become obsolete when a newer version of them is created.

The free space remaining in the file system is the gap between the log's tail and its head. When this runs low, a garbage collector copies valid nodes from the head to the tail and skips obsolete ones, thus reclaiming space.

== See also ==
- List of file systems
- NILFS
- UBIFS
- YAFFS
