= FFS2 =

FFS2 can refer to

- FFS2, Flash File System 2, developed and patented by Microsoft.
- FFS2, Unix File System, Berkeley Fast File System, the BSD Fast File System or FFS
- FFS2, Amiga Fast File System
