= CE Linux Forum =

Former non-profit organization

The Consumer Electronics Linux Forum (CE Linux Forum or CELF) was a non-profit organization to advance the Linux operating system as an open-source software platform for consumer electronics (CE) devices. It had a primarily technical focus, working on specifications, implementations, conferences and testing to help Linux developers improve Linux for use in CE products. It existed from 2003 to 2010.

== History ==
The forum was an outgrowth of a joint project between Sony Corporation and Matsushita Electric Industrial Co. Ltd. (using the brand name Panasonic). CELF was founded in June 2003 by those plus six more consumer electronics companies, Hitachi Ltd., NEC Corporation, Royal Philips Electronics, Samsung Electronics Co. Ltd., Sharp Corporation, and Toshiba Corporation. It was seen at least partially as a reaction to the use of Windows CE for consumer electronics.

Phillips and Samsung founded a group with similar aims in November 2004, promoting a universal home application programming interface called the UHAPI Forum. The UHAPI was presented to the CE Linux Forum in 2005. NXP Semiconductors spun off from Phillips in 2006, and the UHAP was revised up to a version 1.2. A sample implementation of UHAPI was published on SourceForge. The UHAPI forum added a few other supporters, such as the Digital TV Alliance of China and Japan-based Access (company), and maintained a web site until the Great Recession of 2008.

By 2004, hardware from Renesas Electronics running software from Lineo was demonstrated at a CELF meeting. In 2005, a meeting in San Jose, California drew about engineers from competing companies. By the end of 2006, the competing Linux Phone Standards Forum had formed, to focus on mobile devices. After other groups such as Linaro and the Limo Foundation formed, some questioned the fragmentation of the industry. In 2010, the CE Linux Forum merged with the Linux Foundation, to become a technical work group of Linux Foundation. The group planned to support the Yocto Project to produce an embedded Linux distribution.

== Activities ==
CELF initiatives included:

- technical working groups, which produce specifications and implementations (usually patches against existing open source projects) to enhance Linux suitability for CE products
- hosting of conferences dedicated to embedded Linux (see below)
- providing hardware resources to open source developers
- funding for direct feature development, via contracting with a few Linux developers
- a test lab in San Jose, California was established in 2006

Members submit technical output directly back to the relevant open source project (for example, by sending enhancements to the Linux kernel directly to the Linux kernel mailing list, or to an appropriate technology- or architecture-specific mailing list.) Collected information and forum output was primarily located on a wiki for embedded developers. The content of CELF's wiki was included on another site called eLinux.org, created by Tim Riker in 2006. As of 2007, CELF had the following technical working groups:

1. Audio, Video and Graphics
2. Bootup Time
3. Digital Television Profile
4. Memory Management
5. Mobile Phone Profile
6. Power Management
7. Real Time
8. Security
9. System Size

The CE Linux Forum sponsors embedded projects. Amongst others the LinuxTiny patches and the LogFS and SquashFS flash file systems have been pushed to mainline Linux.

The forum sponsored the Embedded Linux Conference since 2005. Originally started as a conference in the US, a yearly ELC Europe started in 2007. in 2007 it was hosted with the Real-time Linux Workshop in Linz, Austria; in 2008 with the NLUUG in Ede, Netherlands; and in 2009 with Embedded Systems Week in Grenoble.

CELF sponsored the Linux Symposium from 2004 to 2008, hosting sessions specific to embedded use of Linux and development of Linux capabilities for embedded use. In Japan and Korea, CELF organizes Technical Jamborees every two months. Jamborees are smaller, have a single track, and are held in the local language.

By 2009 CELF had about 30 members, consisting of consumer electronics manufacturers, semiconductor vendors, and Linux software companies: ARM Ltd., AXE, Inc., Broadcom, Canon Inc., ETRI, Fujitsu Limited, Fuji-Xerox, Hewlett-Packard, Hitachi, Ltd., IBM, Intel Corporation, Just Systems Corporation, LG Electronics, Lineo Solutions, Inc, Panasonic Corporation, MIPS Technologies, NEC Corporation, NXP Semiconductors, Renesas, Royal Philips Electronics, Samsung Electronics, Selenic Consulting, Sharp Corporation, SnapGear, Sony Corporation, Toshiba Corporation, Yamaha Corporation

== See also ==
- Linux Foundation - parent organization
- Digital Living Network Alliance, another group from 2004 to 2017
