= Trim (computing) =

Type of command for solid-state drive

A trim command (known as TRIM in the ATA command set, and UNMAP in the SCSI command set) allows an operating system to inform a storage medium which blocks of data are no longer considered to be "in use" and therefore can be erased internally. TRIM is primarily used on solid-state drives (SSDs), but is also used on some shingled magnetic recording (SMR) hard drives.

Trim commands were introduced soon after SSDs. Because SSDs use different technology from earlier magnetic hard drives, the preexisting techniques for storing data caused early SSDs to become slower as they were used more. With trimming, the SSD can efficiently clear unneeded data that would otherwise slow future write operations.

Although tools to "reset" some drives to a fresh state were already available before the introduction of trimming, they also delete all data on the drive, which makes them impractical to use for ongoing optimization. As of 2010, many SSDs and many flash removable storage devices had internal garbage collection mechanisms for certain filesystem(s) (such as FAT and NTFS) that worked independently of trimming. Although this successfully maintained their lifetime even under operating systems that did not support trim, it had the associated drawbacks of increased write amplification and wear of the flash cells, as well as decreased write performance of flash cells.

== Background ==
Many file systems handle delete operations by flagging data blocks as "not in use". As a result, storage media devices generally do not know which sectors/pages are truly in use and which can be considered free space. Contrary to (for example) an overwrite operation, a delete will not involve writing to the sectors that contained the data. Since a common SSD has no knowledge of the file system structures, including the list of unused blocks/sectors, the storage medium remains unaware that the blocks have become available. This allows undelete tools to recover (parts of) files from electromechanical hard disks, despite the files being reported as "deleted" by the operating system. But it also means that when the operating system later performs a write operation to one of the sectors, which it considers free space, it effectively becomes an overwrite operation from the point of view of the storage medium. For magnetic disks, an overwrite of existing data is no different from writing into an empty sector, but because of how some SSDs function at the lowest level, an overwrite produces significant overhead compared to writing data into an empty page, potentially crippling write performance.

SSDs store data in flash memory cells that are grouped into pages typically of 4 to 16 KiB, grouped together into blocks of typically 128 to 512 pages, for example 512 kiB blocks that group 128 pages of 4 kiB each. NAND flash memory cells can be directly written to only when they are empty. If they happen to contain data, the contents must be erased before a write operation. An SSD write operation can be done to a single page but, due to hardware limitations, erase commands always affect entire blocks. Consequently, writing data to empty pages on an SSD is very fast, but slows down considerably once previously written pages need to be overwritten. Since an erase of the cells in the page is needed before it can be written to again, but only entire blocks can be erased, an overwrite will initiate a read-erase-modify-write cycle: the contents of the entire block are stored in cache, then the entire block is erased from the SSD, then the overwritten page(s) is written into the cached block, and only then can the entire updated block be written to the flash medium. This phenomenon is known as write amplification.

== Operation ==
The TRIM command enables an operating system to notify the drive of pages which no longer contain valid data. For a file deletion operation, the operating system will mark the file's sectors as free for new data, then send a TRIM command to the drive. After trimming, the drive will not preserve any contents of the block when writing new data to a page of flash memory, resulting in less write amplification (fewer writes), higher write throughput (no need for a read-erase-modify sequence), thus increasing drive life.

Different drives implement the command somewhat differently, so performance can vary.

TRIM tells the drive to mark an LBA region as invalid and subsequent reads on the region will not return any meaningful data. For a very brief time, the data could still reside on the flash internally. After the TRIM command is issued and garbage collection has taken place, recovery of deleted or corrupted data can be difficult or impossible, depending on the drive's firmware implementation of the command.

== Implementation ==
=== Operating system support ===
The TRIM command is beneficial only if the drive implements it and the operating system requests it. The table below identifies each notable operating system and the first version supporting the command. Additionally, older solid-state drives designed before the addition of the TRIM command to the ATA standard will need firmware updates, otherwise the new command will be ignored. However, not every drive can be upgraded to support trimming.

The support for TRIM also varies by what the particular filesystem driver on the operating system is capable of, since only a program with an understanding of what parts of the disk are free space can safely issue the command, and on the system level this ability tends to lie in the filesystem driver itself.

Operating System	Supported since	Notes
DragonFly BSD	May 2011	
FreeBSD	8.1 – July 2010	Support was added at the block device layer in 8.1. Filesystem support was added in FreeBSD 8.3 and FreeBSD 9, beginning with UFS. ZFS trimming support was added in FreeBSD 9.2. FreeBSD 10 supports trimming on software RAID configurations.
NetBSD	October 2012	
Linux	2.6.28–25 December 2008	Initial support for discard operations was added for FTL NAND flash devices in 2.6.28. Support for the ATA TRIM command was added in 2.6.33. Not all filesystems make use of trim. Among the filesystems that can issue trim requests automatically are ext4, Btrfs, FAT, GFS2, JFS, XFS, ZFS, and NTFS-3G. However, in some distributions, this is disabled by default due to performance concerns, in favor of scheduled trimming on supported SSDs. Ext3, NILFS2 and OCFS2 offer ioctls to perform offline trimming. The TRIM specification calls for supporting a list of trim ranges, but as of kernel 3.0 trim is only invoked with a single range that is slower. In many newer Linux distributions, systemd provides fstrim.timer unit. TRIM for swap partition can be enabled by swapon utility or fstab.
macOS	10.6.8–23 June 2011	Although the AHCI block device driver gained the ability to display whether a device supports the TRIM operation in 10.6.6 (10J3210), the functionality itself remained inaccessible until 10.6.8, when the TRIM operation was exposed via the IOStorageFamily and filesystem (HFS+) support was added. Until 10.10.4, Mac OS X natively enabled TRIM only for Apple-branded SSDs, except for external removable SSDs; third-party utilities are available to enable it for other brands. Old third party TRIM drivers stopped working as of the Yosemite update. Updated drivers now exist that work with OS X Yosemite. In Mac OS X update 10.10.4, Apple added a command line utility, trimforce, that can be used to enable TRIM on third-party SSDs.
Microsoft Windows	Windows 7 and Windows Server 2008 R2 – October 2009	Windows 7 initially supported TRIM only for drives in the AT Attachment family including Parallel ATA and Serial ATA, and did not support this command for any other devices including Storport PCI-Express SSDs even if the device itself would accept the command. It is confirmed that with native Microsoft drivers the TRIM command works on Windows 7 in AHCI and legacy IDE / ATA Mode. Windows 8 and later Windows operating systems support the unmap command for devices that use the SCSI driver stack, including USB Attached SCSI Protocol (UASP). Windows 8.1 and later Windows operating systems support the TRIM command for NVM Express SSDs. Microsoft has released an update for Windows 7 that adds NVM Express support including TRIM for PCIe SSDs. TRIM is known to be supported for ReFS and NTFS, both of which implement a DisableDeleteNotify switch for disabling it. It is also supported for Bitlocker volumes with ReFS and NTFS volumes within. However, Windows does not support TRIM on exFAT or the older FAT/FAT32 filesystems.
OpenSolaris	July 2010	
Android	4.3 – 24 July 2013	Runs fstrim automatically up to once every 24 hours if the device has been idle for at least an hour and is at least 80% charged (30% if connected to a charger). Actual implementations may differ from OEMs.
Windows Phone	Windows Phone 7	Supports TRIM since Windows Phone 7.
iOS	iOS 4	Supports TRIM since iOS 4 and iPhone 4.

=== RAID issues ===
As of January 2017, support for the TRIM command is not implemented in most hardware-based RAID technologies. However, software RAID implementations often do include support for TRIM.

==== Windows ====
Windows 10 offers support for TRIM in SSD ID volumes using the "optimize drives" option when configuring a RAID volume.

==== macOS ====
The macOS RAID driver does not support TRIM. This is true for all versions of Mac OS X from 10.7 through macOS 10.12.

==== Linux ====
TRIM is available with RAID volumes in post-January-2011 releases of the Linux kernel's dmraid, which implements BIOS-assisted "fake hardware RAID" support, and which now passes through any TRIM requests from the filesystem that sits on the RAID array.

Not to be confused with dmraid, Linux's general-purpose software RAID system, mdraid, has experimental support for batch-based (rather than live, upon file deletion) TRIM on RAID 1 arrays when systems are configured to periodically run the mdtrim utility on filesystems (even those like ext3 without native TRIM support). In later versions of Linux, e.g. Red Hat Enterprise Linux 6.5 and beyond, mdraid supports actually passing through TRIM commands in real-time, rather than just as a batch job.

However, Red Hat recommends against using software RAID levels 1, 4, 5, and 6 on SSDs with most RAID technologies, because during initialization, most RAID management utilities (e.g. Linux's mdadm) write to all blocks on the devices to ensure that checksums (or drive-to-drive verifies, in the case of RAID 1 and 10) operate properly, causing the SSD to believe that all blocks other than in the spare area are in use, significantly degrading performance.

On the other hand, Red Hat does recommend the use of RAID 1 or RAID 10 for LVM RAIDs on SSDs, as these levels support TRIM ("discard" in Linux terminology), and the LVM utilities do not write to all blocks when creating a RAID 1 or RAID 10 volume.

==== Firmware-based RAID ====
For a short time in March 2010, users were led to believe that the Intel Rapid Storage Technology (RST) 9.6 (and later) drivers in Windows 7 supported TRIM on RAID volumes, but Intel later clarified that TRIM was supported for the BIOS settings of AHCI mode and RAID mode, but not if the drive was part of a RAID volume.

As of August 2012, Intel confirms that 7-series chipsets with Rapid Storage Technology (RST) 11.2 drivers support TRIM for RAID 0 in Microsoft Windows 7. While Intel did not confirm support for 6-series chipsets, TRIM on RAID 0 volumes has been shown to work on Z68, P67, and X79 chipsets by hardware enthusiasts with a modified RAID option ROM. It is speculated that the lack of official support for 6-series chipsets is due to validation costs or an attempt to encourage consumers to upgrade, rather than for technical reasons.

An exception to the need for a modified option ROM on motherboards with an X79 chipset is if the manufacturer has added a ROM switch; this entails both the RST and RST-E ROMs being inside the BIOS/UEFI. This allows the RST ROM to be used instead of the RST-E ROM, allowing TRIM to function. Intel notes that best performance can be achieved by using a driver with same version as the ROM; for example, if the BIOS/UEFI has an 11.0.0.0m option ROM, an 11.x version driver should be used.

=== Enabling unsupported filesystems ===
Where the filesystem does not automatically support TRIM, some utilities can send trimming commands manually. Usually they determine which blocks are free and then pass this list as a series of trimming commands to the drive. These utilities are available from various manufacturers (e.g. Intel, G.Skill), or as general utilities (e.g. Linux's hdparm "wiper" since v9.17, or mdtrim, as mentioned above). Both hdparm and mdtrim find free blocks by allocating a large file on the filesystem and resolving what physical location it was assigned to.

Regardless of operating system, the drive can detect when the computer writes all zeros to a block, and de-allocate (trim) that block instead of recording the block of zeros. If reading a de-allocated block always returns zeros, this shortcut is transparent to the user, except for faster writing (and reading) of all-zero blocks, in addition to the usual benefit of faster writing into unused areas. Operating systems do not write all zeros to "wipe" files or free space, but some utilities do.

== Hardware support ==
=== ATA ===
The TRIM command specification has been standardized as part of the AT Attachment (ATA) interface standard, led by Technical Committee T13 of the International Committee for Information Technology Standards (INCITS). TRIM is implemented under the DATA SET MANAGEMENT command (opcode 06h) of the draft ACS-2 specification. The ATA standard is supported by both parallel (IDE, PATA) and serial (SATA) ATA hardware.

A drawback of the original ATA TRIM command is that it was defined as a non-queueable command and therefore could not easily be mixed with a normal workload of queued read and write operations. SATA 3.1 introduced a queued TRIM command to remedy this.

There are different types of TRIM defined by SATA Words 69 and 169 returned from an ATA IDENTIFY DEVICE command:

- Non-deterministic TRIM: Each read command to the logical block address (LBA) after a TRIM may return different data.
- Deterministic TRIM (DRAT): All read commands to the LBA after a TRIM shall return the same data, or become determinate.
- Deterministic Read Zero after TRIM (RZAT): All read commands to the LBA after a TRIM shall return zero.

There is additional information in SATA Word 105 that describes the Maximum number of 512-byte blocks per DATA SET MANAGEMENT command that a drive can support. Typically this defaults to 8 (or 4 kB) but many drives reduce this to 1 to meet the Microsoft Windows Hardware Requirements for TRIM, that command completion time shall not exceed 20 ms or 8 ms × (number of LBA range entries), whichever is greater, and shall always be less than 600 ms.

An individual LBA range is called an LBA Range Entry and is represented by eight bytes. The LBA is expressed by the LBA Range Entry's first six bytes and the Range Length is a zero-based counter (e.g., 0=0 and 1=1) represented by the remaining two bytes. If the two-byte range length is zero, then the LBA Range Entry shall be discarded as padding. This means that for each 512-byte block of TRIM ranges that a device supports, the maximum is 64 ranges of 32 MB, or 2 GB. If a device supports SATA Word 105 at 8 then it should be able to trim 16 GB in a single TRIM (DATA SET MANAGEMENT) command.

=== SCSI ===
SCSI provides the UNMAP command (a full analog of TRIM), and the WRITE SAME command (10 and 16 variants) with the UNMAP flag set.

=== SD/MMC ===
The MultiMediaCard and SD ERASE (CMD38) command provides similar functionality to the ATA TRIM command, although it requires that erased blocks be overwritten with either zeroes or ones. A DISCARD sub-operation is further defined in eMMC 4.5, and optionally in SDHC and SDXC cards, that more closely matches ATA TRIM in that the contents of discarded blocks can be considered indeterminate (i.e., "don't care").

=== NVM Express ===
The NVM Express command set has a generic Dataset Management command, for hinting the host's intent to the storage device on a set of block ranges. If that command is executed with the Attribute – Deallocate (AD) bit set to 1 in Command Dword 11, it performs trim. It also has a Write Zeroes command, which contains a Deallocate (DEAC) bit in Command Dword 12 that allows the disk to trim and return zeroes.

== Disadvantages ==
- Some deniable encryption schemes involve making the whole disk look like random garbage. Using TRIM defeats this layer of plausible deniability as the all-zero (or all-one) blocks created easily indicate what blocks are used. It has been argued disabling TRIM might be suspicious too.
- The original version of the TRIM command has been defined as a non-queued command by the T13 subcommittee, and consequently can incur massive execution penalty if used carelessly, e.g., if sent after each filesystem delete command. The non-queued nature of the command requires the driver to first wait for all outstanding commands to be finished, issue the TRIM command, then resume normal commands. TRIM can take a lot of time to complete, depending on the firmware in the SSD, and may even trigger a garbage collection cycle. This penalty can be minimized in solutions that do batched TRIMs and/or periodic TRIMs, rather than trimming upon every file deletion, by scheduling such batch jobs for times when system utilization is low. This TRIM disadvantage has been overcome in Serial ATA revision 3.1 with the introduction of the Queued TRIM Command. Windows 8 added support for periodic TRIM and queued TRIM.
- Only some hypervisors (such as Hyper-V, Parallels Desktop) have implemented TRIM for the Guest OS (as of 2023).
- Faulty drive firmware that misreports support for queued TRIM or has critical bugs in its implementation has been linked to serious data corruption and/or serious bugs like frequent freezes in several devices, most notably Micron and Crucial's M500 and Samsung's 840 and 850 series. The data corruption has been confirmed on the Linux operating system (the only OS with queued trim support as of 1 July 2015).

These devices are blacklisted in the Linux kernel's libata-core.c to force sending non-queued TRIM commands (ATA_QUIRK_NO_NCQ_TRIM) to these drives instead of queued TRIM commands:

- Micron/Crucial M500 using all firmware versions including factory recertified SSDs
- Micron M510 using firmware version MU01
- Micron/Crucial M550 using firmware version MU01
- Crucial MX100 using firmware version MU01
- Samsung 840 and 850 series SSDs using all firmware versions

This file also blacklists the SuperSSpeed S238 against TRIM in general due to causing the wrong blocks to lose data when TRIM is issued.

libata-core.c also has a whitelist to list SSDs that are reliably known to the subsystem's maintainers to correctly implement the DRAT and RZAT flags (ATA_QUIRK_ZERO_AFTER_TRIM), rather than ignoring them, as many drives do. The whitelisted drives are as follows:

- Crucial SSDs
- Intel SSDs excluding the Intel SSD 510
- Micron SSDs
- Samsung SSDs
- Seagate SSDs

== See also ==
- Data remanence
