= YAFFS =

File system

- Developer: Charles Manning
- Full name: Yet Another Flash File System

Other
- Supported operating systems: Android, Firefox OS, Linux, Windows CE, pSOS, RTEMS, eCos, ThreadX, LCOS
- Website: https://yaffs.net

YAFFS (Yet Another Flash File System) is a file system designed and written by Charles Manning for the company Aleph One.

YAFFS1 was the first version of this file system and was designed for the then-current NAND chips with 512 byte page size (+ 16 byte spare (OOB; Out-Of-Band) area). Work started in 2002, and it was first released later that year. The initial work was sponsored by Toby Churchill Ltd, and Brightstar Engineering.

YAFFS is a robust log-structured file system that holds data integrity as a high priority. A secondary YAFFS goal is high performance. YAFFS will typically outperform most alternatives. It is also designed to be portable and has been used on Linux, Android, WinCE, pSOS, RTEMS, eCos, ThreadX, and various special-purpose OSes. A variant 'YAFFS/Direct' is used in situations where there is no OS, embedded OSes or bootloaders: it has the same core filesystem but simpler interfacing to both the higher and lower level code and the NAND flash hardware.

The YAFFS codebase is licensed both under the GPL and under per-product licenses available from Aleph One.

YAFFS is locked on a per-partition basis at a high level, allowing only one thread to write at any given time.

== YAFFS1 ==
There is no special procedure to initialize a YAFFS filesystem beyond simply erasing the flash memory. When a bad block is encountered, YAFFS follows the smart media scheme of marking the fifth byte of the block's spare area. Blocks marked as such remain unallocated from then on.

To write file data, YAFFS initially writes a whole page (chunk in YAFFS terminology) that describes the file metadata, such as timestamps, name, path, etc. The new file is assigned a unique object ID number; every data chunk within the file will contain this unique object ID within the spare area. YAFFS maintains a tree structure in RAM of the physical location of these chunks. When a chunk is no longer valid (the file is deleted, or parts of the file are overwritten), YAFFS marks a particular byte in the spare area of the chunk as 'dirty'. When an entire block (32 pages) is marked as dirty, YAFFS can erase the block and reclaim the space. When the filesystem's free space is low, YAFFS consolidates a group of good pages onto a new block. YAFFS then reclaims the space used by dirty pages within each of the original blocks.

When a YAFFS system mounts a NAND flash device, it must visit each block to check for valid data by scanning its spare area. With this information it then reconstitutes the memory-resident tree data structure.

== YAFFS2 ==
YAFFS2 is similar in concept to YAFFS1, and shares much of the same code; the YAFFS2 code base supports YAFFS1 data formats through backward compatibility. The main difference is that YAFFS2 needs to jump through significant hoops to meet the "write once" requirement of modern NAND flash.

YAFFS2 marks every newly written block with a sequence number that is monotonically increasing. The sequence of the chunks can be inferred from the block sequence number and the chunk offset within the block. Thereby when YAFFS2 scans the flash and detects multiple chunks that have identical ObjectIDs and ChunkNumbers, it can choose which to use by taking the greatest sequence number. For efficiency reasons YAFFS2 also introduces the concept of shrink headers. For example, when a file is resized to a smaller size, YAFFS1 will mark all of the affected chunks as dirty – YAFFS2 cannot do this due to the "write once" rule. YAFFS2 instead writes a "shrink header", which indicates that a certain number of pages before that point are invalid. This lets YAFFS2 reconstruct the final state of the filesystem when the system reboots.

YAFFS2 uses a more abstract definition of the NAND flash allowing it to be used with a wider variety of flash parts with different geometries, bad block handling rules etc.

YAFFS2 later added support for checkpointing, which bypasses normal mount scanning, allowing very fast mount times. Performance will vary, but mount times of 3 seconds for 2 GB have been reported.

== See also ==
- List of file systems
- JFFS
- JFFS2
- UBIFS
- LogFS
- NILFS, a New Implementation of a Log-structured File System
- Open NAND Flash Interface Working Group
