= Comparison of file synchronization software =

This is a list of notable file synchronization software.

== Free and open-source ==
| Name | Programming language | Platform | License | Last version | Portable | Detect conflict | Renames or moves | Propagate deletes | Version control | Scheduling or service | Other | Bidirectional | Only client needed | Protocol layer | Application layer | Delta copying |
|---|---|---|---|---|---|---|---|---|---|---|---|---|---|---|---|---|
| Copyparty | Python | Linux, FreeBSD, macOS, Windows | MIT | 2026 | Yes | Yes | Yes | Yes | No | Yes (via OS) | Yes | | | | | |
| Conduit | Python | Linux, FreeBSD | GPL | 2010 | No | | | | | Yes | Synchronizes files, website, network apps | | | | | |
| DirSync Pro | Java | Windows, macOS, Linux | GPLv3 | 2018 | Yes | Yes | No | | Yes (creates backup files) | Yes (native + via OS) | sym-links, filter, metadata, contents, auto-sync | | | | | |
| FreeFileSync | C++ | Windows, macOS, Linux | GPL (up to version 12.5) | last GPL version 12.5 Jul 21, 2023 | Yes (donation edition) | Yes | Yes | Yes | Yes (versioning, recycler) | Yes | Older version had OpenCandy adware/malware, but now funded by donations. Since Version 13 license for business usage needed | Yes (two-way, mirror, update, custom) | Yes | | | |
| iFolder | C#, Mono | Windows, macOS, Linux, Solaris | GPL | 2010 | No | Yes (centralized database) | Yes (files, not folders) | | | | | | | | | |
| Kubo (IPFS) | Go | Windows, macOS, Linux | GPL | 2022 | | Yes | | | No (planned) | | | | | Noise/TCP and QUIC/UDP | Libp2p | Yes (network-wide de-duplication) |
| luckyBackup | C++ | Windows, macOS, Linux, FreeBSD | GPLv3 | 2018 | Yes | | | | | Yes | Uses rsync backend | | | | | |
| Nextcloud | JavaScript, PHP, Shell, Python, Vue | Server: Linux, FreeBSD; Clients: Windows, macOS, Linux, FreeBSD, Android, iOS, Windows Phone | AGPLv3 | 2023 | Yes | Yes | Yes | Yes | Yes | Yes | Fork of ownCloud | Yes | No | | | |
| ownCloud community edition | PHP, Go, JavaScript, Starlark, Shell | Server: Linux, FreeBSD; Clients: Windows, macOS, Linux, FreeBSD, Android, iOS, Blackberry | AGPLv3 (server edition) / proprietary (enterprise edition) | 2021 | Yes | Yes | Yes | Yes | Yes | Yes | External storage support; encryption | Yes | No | | | |
| Pydio open source home | Server: PHP, Python, C++ Clients: JS, C#, Swift, Java | Windows, macOS, Linux, Android, iOS | AGPLv3 | 2017 | Yes | Yes | Yes | | Yes (Git) | Yes | | | | | | |
| rclone | Go | Linux, Windows, macOS, FreeBSD, NetBSD, OpenBSD, Plan9, Solaris - Intel/AMD-64, Intel/AMD-32, ARM-32, ARM-64, MIPS-Big-Endian, MIPS-Little-Endian | MIT | 2026 | Yes | Yes | Yes | Yes | Yes | Yes (via OS) | Supports over 50 cloud, protocol and virtual backends including S3 buckets, Google Drive, Microsoft OneDrive, and other high-latency file storage. Capabilities include sync, cache, encrypt, compress and mount. | | Yes | | | |
| rsync | C in a Unix-Linux shell | Windows, macOS, Linux, BSD | GPL v3 | 2025 | Yes | No | No | Yes using --delete | Yes using --backup and a time-stamped --suffix | Yes (via OS) | Client and server operation. Multiple comparison criteria (date, check-sum). | No, but can run in either direction | Yes | TCP | SSH, Rsh | Yes |
| Seafile community edition | C99, Python | Server: Linux, Raspbian, Windows; Clients: Linux, macOS, Windows, Android, iOS. | AGPLv3 (Server) + Apache License 2.0 (Client) | 2020 | No | Yes | Yes | Yes | Yes | Yes (via Seafile Client) | Android and iOS mobile clients | | | | | |
| SparkleShare | C# | Windows, macOS, Linux, Android, iOS | GPL v3 and LGPL | 2017 | Yes | Yes | No | | Yes (Git) | | | | | | | |
| SymmetricDS | Java | Java SE | GPL | 2018 | Yes | Yes | Yes | | No | Yes | Plug-in APIs for customization | | | | | |
| Synchronizer (krusader) | | Windows, macOS, Linux | GPL v2 | 2017 | No | Yes | No | | No | No | | | | | | |
| Syncthing | Go | Windows, macOS, Linux, Android, BSD, Solaris, 3rd party app for IPhone | MPL v2 | 2025 | Yes | Yes | Yes | Yes | Yes | Yes | Distributed peer-to-peer sync with automatic NAT traversal. Custom topology (star, full-mesh, mixed). Encryption. | Yes | Yes | TCP, QUIC over UDP | | Yes, block-based copying |
| Synkron | C++ | Windows, macOS, Linux | GPL v2 | 2011 | Yes | Yes | No | Yes | Yes | Yes | | | | | | |
| Unison | Mainly OCaml | Windows, macOS, Linux | GPL | 2024 | Yes | Yes | Yes | Yes | Yes | Yes | Uses rsync backend | Yes | No | TCP | SSH, socket | Yes |
| Name | Programming language | Platform | License | Last version | Portable | Detect conflict | Renames or moves | Propagate deletes | Version control | Scheduling or service | Other info | Bidirectional | Only client needed | Protocol layer | Application layer | Delta copying |

== Freeware ==
This is a comparison of the freeware (proprietary software released free of charge) file synchronization software.

| Name | Operating system | Vendor | Online storage | Remote desktop | Prior file versions, revision control | Comments | Portable | Detect rename | Detect move | Scheduling | Full duplex transfer |
|---|---|---|---|---|---|---|---|---|---|---|---|
| Microsoft ActiveSync | Windows | Microsoft | No | No | ? | Syncs mobile devices | | | | | |
| Resilio Sync (formerly BitTorrent Sync) | Windows, OS X, Linux, FreeBSD, Android, iOS | Resilio, Inc. | No | No | Yes (via archive folder) | Distributed peer-to-peer sync., working also offline in a LAN | No | Yes | Yes | Pro only | Yes |
| Briefcase (part of Windows) (removed in Windows 10 build 14942) | Windows | Microsoft | No | No | ? | | | | | | |
| Cobian Backup | Windows | CobianSoft | No | No | Yes, trash folder | Backup software with folder synchronization feature; remote management; Shadow Copy | No | No | No | Yes | |
| Windows Mobile Device Center | Windows | Microsoft | No | No | ? | Syncs mobile devices; successor to Microsoft ActiveSync | | | | | |
| Microsoft Sync Framework | Windows | Microsoft | ? | No | ? | Syncs files, data, services; a framework, not a tool | | Yes | Yes | — | |
| Microsoft SyncToy (discontinued January 2021) | Windows | Microsoft | No | No | No, recycle bin only | Sync. local folders | No | Yes | Yes | via OS | No |
| Windows Live Mesh (discontinued 13 February 2013) | Windows (Vista and greater), Windows Mobile, OSX | Microsoft | Yes | Yes | No, recycle bin only | Sync. folders, online storage | No | Yes | ? | No, syncs whenever it is online | Yes |
| OmniGroup OmniPresence | OSX, OmniGroup software for iOS, open source framework available | OmniGroup | No | No | No, via local Time Machine backup only | Sync. local folders via OmniSync or WebDAV server but not to the server itself | No | ? | ? | No, syncs whenever it's online and not paused | Yes |
| Windows Live Sync (discontinued 31 March 2011) | Windows, OSX | Microsoft | No, browsing only | No | No, recycle bin only | Sync. folders, browse devices from website, remote access; was Microsoft FolderShare, 20,000 file limit | No | Yes | Yes | No, syncs whenever it's online | ? |

== Commercial ==
This is a comparison of commercial software in the field of file synchronization. These programs only provide full functionality with a payment. As indicated, some are trialware and provide functionality during a trial period; some are freemium, meaning that they have freeware editions.

| Name | Operating system | Freeware version | Portable | Encrypts files | Detect conflict | File lock | Open file support | Revision control | Detect rename | Detect move | Full duplex transfer | Propagate deletes | Case sensitive | Delta transfer | LAN sync. | P2P sync. |
|---|---|---|---|---|---|---|---|---|---|---|---|---|---|---|---|---|
| @MAX SyncUp | Windows | Limited | No | | Yes | Yes | Yes | | No | No | | Yes | | Yes | Yes | |
| Allway Sync | Windows | Limited | Yes | Yes | Yes | | Yes | Yes | No | No | Yes | Yes | | | Yes | |
| AIMstor (discontinued) | Windows | Limited | Yes | | Yes | Yes | Yes | Yes through VSS | Yes | Yes | Yes | Yes | Case preserving only | | | |
| Argentum Backup | Windows | No | Yes | | | | No | Yes | | | | | Yes | | | |
| BackupAssist | Windows | No | | | No | | Yes | | | | | | | | | |
| Beyond Compare | Windows, OS X, Linux | Limited | Yes | No | Yes | | Yes | Yes | | | | Yes | | | | |
| Box Sync | Windows, OS X, Android, BlackBerry, iOS | Limited | | | Yes | ? | ? | Yes | ? | ? | ? | Yes | ? | | No | |
| Cloudike | Windows, OS X, iPhone, Android, HarmonyOS | Yes | No | Yes | Yes | No | Yes | Yes | Yes | Yes | Yes | Yes | Yes | Yes | Yes | |
| CloudMe | Windows, OS X, Linux, iPhone, Android, Google TV, Samsung TV | Yes | No | | Yes | ? | ? | No | Yes | No | ? | ? | Yes | ? | No | |
| Distributed Storage | Windows, Linux | No | | | Yes | Yes | Yes | | | | | | | | | |
| Dmailer Sync (discontinued) | Windows | Yes | | | | | | | | | | | | | | |
| Dropbox | Windows, OS X, Linux, Android, iPhone, BlackBerry | Yes | No | | Yes | ? | ? | Yes | Yes | Yes | Yes | Yes | Yes | Yes | Yes | |
| Easy2Sync for Files | Windows | Yes | | | Yes | | | Yes | Yes, for folders | | | | | | | |
| Egnyte | Windows, OS X, Linux, Android, iPad, iPhone | No | No | | Yes | Yes | Yes | Yes | Yes | Yes | Yes | Yes | Case preserving only | Yes | Yes | |
| Gladinet | Windows, OS X, Android, iPad, iPhone, Windows RT, Blackberry | Yes | Yes | Yes | Yes | Yes | Yes | Yes | Yes | Yes | Yes | Yes | Yes | Yes | Yes | |
| GoDrive | Windows, Mac OS X, Linux, Android, iOS | Limited | Yes | Yes | Yes | Yes | Yes | Yes | Yes | Yes | ? | Yes | Yes | ? | Yes | |
| GoodSync | Windows, OS X, Android, iPad, iPhone, USB flash drive | Limited | Yes | Yes, beta | Yes | Yes | Yes | Yes | Yes | Yes | Yes | Yes | Yes | Yes | Yes | |
| IBM Connections | Windows, OS X, Android, iOS | No | Yes | Yes | Yes | Yes | Yes | Yes | Yes | Yes | Yes | Yes | Yes | Yes | No | |
| MediaFire | Windows, OS X, Android, iOS | Yes | | Yes | Yes | Yes | Yes | Yes | Yes | Yes | Yes | Yes | Yes | Yes | No | |
| Name | Operating system | Freeware version | Portable | Encrypts files | Detect conflict | File lock | Open file support | Revision control | Detect rename | Detect move | Full duplex transfer | Propagate deletes | Case sensitive | Delta transfer | LAN sync. | P2P sync. |
| Mega | Windows, OS X, Linux, Android, iPhone, BlackBerry | Yes | | Yes | Yes | | | Yes | Yes | Yes | Yes | Yes | Yes | No | No | |
| RepliWeb | Windows, Linux | No | | | Partial | | | Yes | Yes | Yes | Yes | Yes | Yes | | | |
| Resilio Sync (ex. BitTorrent Sync) | Windows, OS X, Linux, Android, iOS, Windows Phone, Amazon Kindle Fire, FreeBSD | Limited | No | Yes, optional | Yes | No | No | Yes | Yes | Yes | Yes | Yes | | Yes | Yes | Yes |
| Robocopy | Windows | Yes | No | | No | | | | | | | | | | | |
| SecureSafe | Windows, OS X, Android, iOS | Yes | | | Yes | No | | No | No | No | No | Yes | Yes | No | No | |
| SpiderOak | Windows, OS X, Debian, Fedora, Slackware, Android, iOS | No | | | No | | | Yes | No | | No | | | Yes | Yes | |
| ShareFile | Windows, OS X, Android, iPhone | Yes | | Yes | | | | Yes | Yes | | Yes | | Yes | | Yes | |
| SugarSync | Windows, OS X, Android, BlackBerry, iPhone, Windows Mobile | No | No | | Yes | | | Yes | Yes | Yes | | Yes | | | | |
| Syncdocs | Windows, web app | Beta versions only | Yes | | Yes | No | Yes | Yes | Yes | Yes | Microsoft Word only | Yes | | | | |
| Synchronize It! | Windows | No | | | No | | | | | | | | | | | |
| Syncovery | Windows, OS X, Linux, FreeBSD | No | Yes | Yes | Yes | Yes | Yes | Yes | Yes | Yes | Yes | Yes | Yes | Yes | Yes | |
| Syncplicity | Windows, OS X, Android, iPhone, Windows Mobile | Yes | | | Yes | | | Yes | | | Yes | Yes | | No | No | |
| Tonido | Windows, OS X, Linux, Android, BlackBerry, iPhone, Windows Phone | Yes | Yes | | Yes | No | Yes | No | Yes | Yes | Yes | Yes | | | | |
| Tresorit | Windows, OS X, Linux, Android, BlackBerry, iOS, Windows Phone | Limited | Yes | Yes | Yes | | Yes, for Windows | Yes | | | | Yes | Yes | No | | |
| Ubuntu One (discontinued 2 April 2014) | Windows, OS X, Ubuntu, iOS, Android | Yes | | | | | | | | | | | | | | |
| Wuala (discontinued) | Windows, OS X, Debian, Ubuntu, Android, iOS | Yes | | Yes | | | | | | | | | | | | |
| ZumoDrive (discontinued) | Windows, OS X, Linux, Android, iPhone, Palm webOS | Yes | | | Yes | | | Yes | | | | | | | | |
| Zetta.net | Windows, OS X, Linux | No | | | Yes | | Yes | Yes | Yes | Yes | | Yes | Yes, Preserve file name case & file metadata | Yes | Yes | |
| Name | Operating system | Freeware version | Portable | Encrypts files | Detect conflict | File lock | Open file support | Revision control | Detect rename | Detect move | Full duplex transfer | Propagate deletes | Case sensitive | Delta transfer | LAN sync. | P2P sync. |

== Glossary ==
Platform
Operating system & / or software platform like Java SE or .NET.
Edit conflict detection
Detect if an operation may result in data loss. See File Synchronization
Renames/moves
Propagate renaming/moving of a file/directory. This saves bandwidth for remote systems but increases the analysis duration. Commonly done by calculating and storing hash function digests of files to detect if two files with different names, edit dates, etc., have identical contents. Programs which do not support it, will behave as if the originally-named file/directory has been deleted and the newly named file/directory is new and transmit the "new" file again.
Version control
Can revert to a precedent version of a file/directory.
Scheduling or service
Run automatically (via a scheduler or as a system service), or manually for each sync.
Online storage
Online file storage option and type
Network-attached storage
Can sync. with NAS shares.
Only client needed
It is only needed to install synchronizing software on the client side. Server is only running arbitrary storage protocol like SFTP, SMB, NFS, etc. All synchronization logic is handled by client. This is generally good, because cheap cloud storage usually does not allow users to run custom software on storage server, they only provide access to storage.

== See also ==
- Backup software
  - List of backup software
  - Comparison of online backup services
- Disk cloning
  - Comparison of disk cloning software
- Comparison of file comparison tools
- Comparison of file hosting services
- Comparison of file transfer protocols
- Comparison of version-control software
