= FreeFileSync =

Freeware file synchronization program

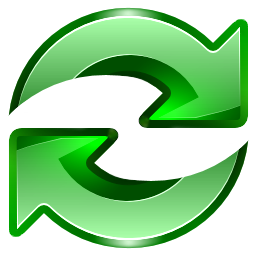

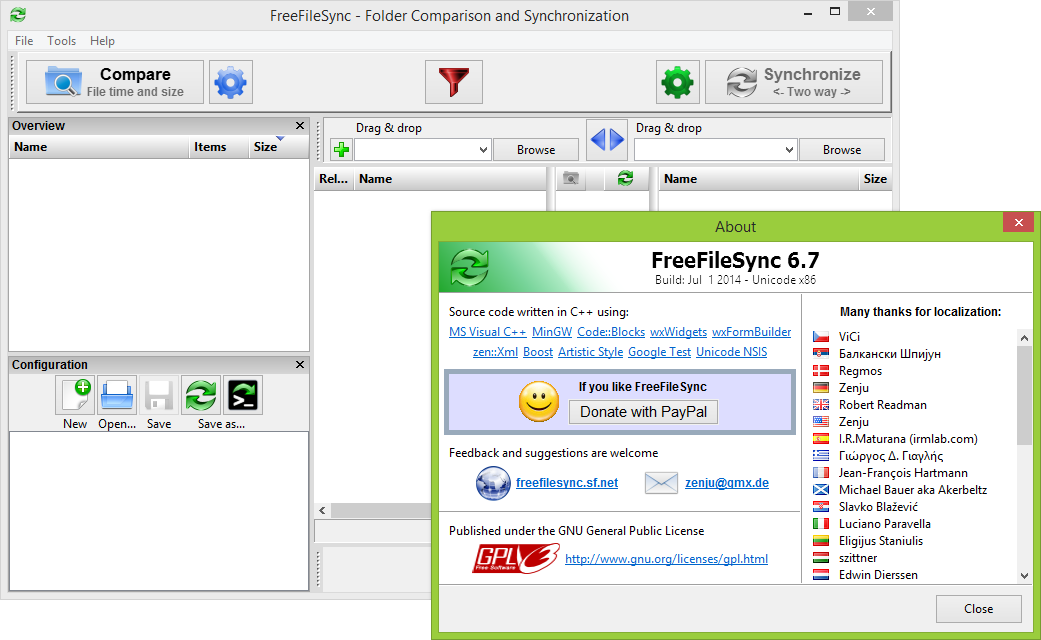
- FreeFileSync 6.7 running on Windows 8.1
- Release: August 2008; 18 years ago
- Stable release: 14.7 / 21 January 2026; 6 months ago
- Operating system: Windows, Linux, macOS
- Platform: IA-32, x86-64
- Type: File synchronization utility
- License: GNU General Public License v3
- Website: www.freefilesync.org

FreeFileSync is a program used for file synchronization. It is available on Windows, Linux and macOS. The project is backed by donations. Donors get access to a Donation Edition that contains a few additional features such as an auto-updater, parallel sync, portable version, and silent installation. FreeFileSync has received positive reviews. FreeFileSync is available free of charge for personal use; the official Windows installer requires the users to accept the terms of use, which state that for business use they are required to purchase a business edition version of the application.

FreeFileSync works by comparing one or multiple folders on their content, date or file size and subsequently synchronizing the content according to user-defined settings. In addition to supporting local file systems and network shares, FreeFileSync is able to sync to Google Drive, FTP, FTPS, SFTP and MTP devices.

== Adware/malware ==
Earlier versions were packaged with OpenCandy, an adware module which many antivirus software vendors classify as malware.

Since the release of version 10.0 in April 2018, the software is ad-free. In November 2018 Norton wrongly identified the FreeFileSync installer as malware and blocked its execution.

== Supported operating systems ==
FreeFileSync is available for 32bit and 64bit operating systems. As of July 2024 the then current version 13.7 of FreeFileSync supported the following operating systems and versions:

- Windows 11 down to Windows 7.
- macOS 14.0 "Sonoma" down to Mac OS X 10.10 "Yosemite".
- On Linux, many well-known distributions are supported. The website cites Arch Linux, CentOS, Debian, Fedora, Manjaro, Mint, openSUSE and Ubuntu.

=== Older operating systems ===
Support for Windows Vista and XP ended with FreeFileSync_v10.11. The latest release compatible with Mac OS X 10.7.5 is FreeFileSync_8.4_Mac_OS_X. Older versions are still available on the project website.

== See also ==
- Comparison of file hosting services
- Comparison of file synchronization software
- Comparison of online backup services
- List of backup software
- Comparison of backup software
