= Syncplicity =

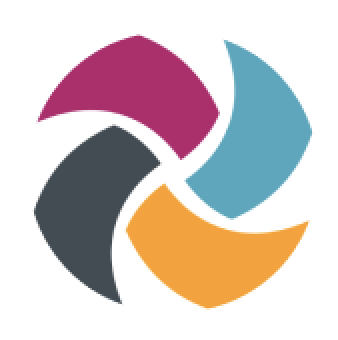
- Developer: Axway
- Operating system: Windows, Mac
- Available in: English
- Type: File sharing
- License: Open Source
- Website: www.syncplicity.com

Syncplicity is a file share and synchronization service developed by Syncplicity Inc. The service lets users store and synchronize files between computers. It supports Microsoft Windows and macOS.

== History ==
The service was initially available for beta test, and became public in 2008.

In late 2010, a client for Intel-based Macintosh computers running Mac OS X version 10.6 or later was released.

On May 21, 2012, Syncplicity, Inc. was acquired by EMC Corporation.

In July 2015, Skyview Capital, a global private investment firm, purchased Syncplicity from EMC.

In February 2017, Axway purchased Syncplicity from Skyview Capital.

== Account types ==
Syncplicity offers both free and paid accounts.

== Other file synchronization services ==
Several file synchronization and backup services launched around the same time as Syncplicity, including Live Mesh, Dropbox, and SugarSync. Syncplicity allows synchronization with other online services including Google Docs, Zoho, and Facebook. Documents can be synchronised with an associated Google Docs account from Windows or Macintosh computers; however, documents uploaded to free Google Docs accounts will be converted to Google Docs file formats where conversion is supported, and otherwise ignored. Photos can be synchronised with Facebook albums. Online services including Scribd and Piknik are supported by Syncplicity.

== Reviews ==
In 2008, Syncplicity was rated the second best synchronization software behind Dropbox in a Lifehacker reader poll, and PCWorld's reviewer called Syncplicity "my top pick among sync services". A later review (under EMC ownership) found that Syncplicity might not be able to compete well with Dropbox and Sugarsync on price and storage, but has features, including security and availability, that might be attractive to business users. The free version offers less storage than other free services.

== See also ==
- Comparison of file hosting services
- Comparison of file synchronization software
- Comparison of online backup services
- Cloud storage
- Remote backup service
