= Cloudike =

Software product

- Developer: Cloudike Inc.
- Written in: Python, JavaScript
- Operating system: Windows, Android, macOS, iOS, HarmonyOS
- Available in: Multilingual
- Type: Cloud storage Data synchronization
- Website: cloudike.com

Cloudike is an on-premise software product developed by Cloudike Inc., a San Francisco based company. The product enables cloud storage service from inside the customer’s data centre & network. Usually, it is used by telco and consumer electronics companies to launch local alternatives to Apple iCloud, Google Drive, Google Photos, Google Contacts, and Dropbox under their own brand and name.

== History ==
Cloudike Inc. started in 2009 as a developer of their Software as a Service platform that grew into a multi-tier cloud service used to build on-premise white-label enterprise data storages for OEMs, Mobile and Internet service providers, consumer electronics distributors and fintech companies.

During its early years, Cloudike successfully launched LG Cloud in 41 countries and partnered with major carriers such as MegaFon in Russia and Vestel in Turkey. By 2014, Cloudike had already raised $1 million in seed funding and was using that capital to grow its sales team and expand into Eastern European and East Asian markets.

== See also ==
- Comparison of file hosting services
- Comparison of online backup services
- Comparison of file synchronization software
