= Synkron =

File synchronization software

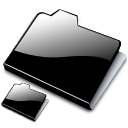

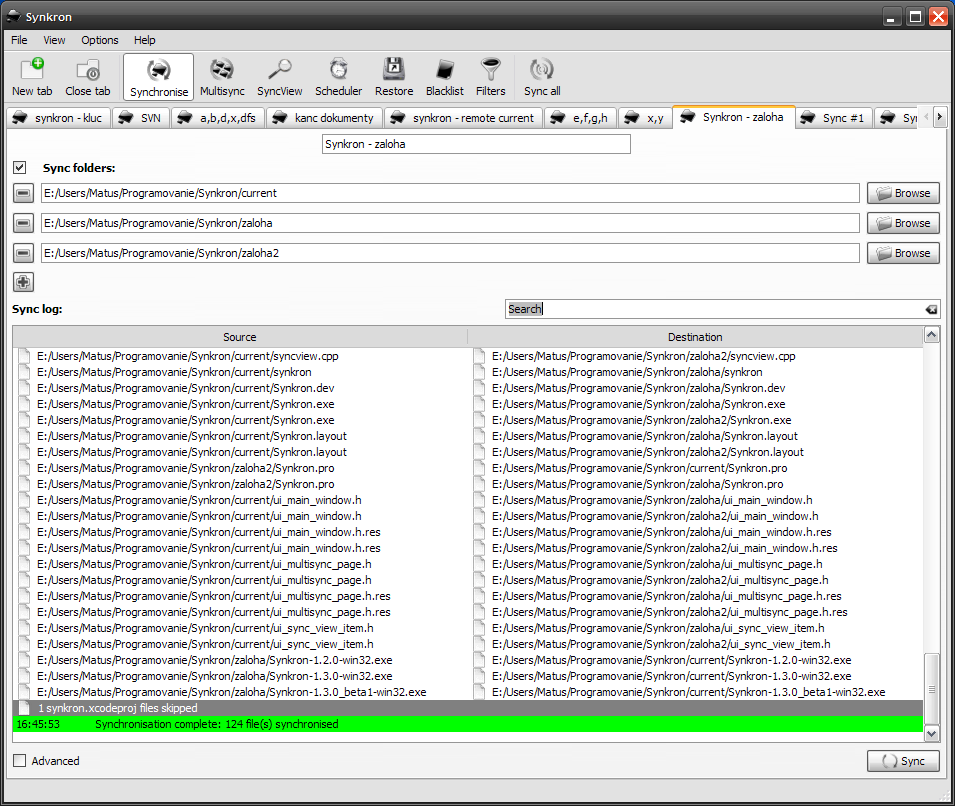
- Synkron
- Original author(s): Matúš Tomlein
- Developer(s): Matúš Tomlein
- Initial release: June 03, 2007; 18 years ago
- Stable release: 1.6.2 / January 25, 2011; 14 years ago
- Repository: sourceforge.net/projects/synkron/
- Written in: C++
- Operating system: Microsoft Windows, Linux, macOS
- Size: Windows: 5.3 MB; macOS: 7.8 MB; Linux: 1.3 MB
- Available in: English, Arabic, Portuguese, Chinese, Czech, Dutch, Finnish, French, German, Italian, Japanese, Polish, Russian, Spanish, Valencian
- Type: File synchronization
- License: GPL v2
- Website: synkron.sourceforge.net

Synkron is an open-source multiplatform utility designed for file synchronization of two or more folders, including synchronization between computers. It is written in C++ and uses the Qt4 libraries. (Note: Qt5 support was added in r200 of the SVN repository; see this discussion thread for build instructions.) Synkron is distributed under the terms of the GPL v2.

Apart from carrying out synchronisations, Synkron provides other features. The user interface of Synkron is divided into several sections: Synchronise, Multisync, SyncView, Scheduler, Restore, Blacklist and Filters. The user can switch between these sections by using the toolbar. Multisync supports synching multiple folders into one folder.

Synkron is available as a portable app. Binaries for 32-bit Windows, macOS, and Linux may be obtained from the project's "Files" page. Most Linux distributions no longer include the binary package in their standard repositories, but the application may be built from source code.

== See also ==
- Comparison of file hosting services
- Comparison of file synchronization software
- Comparison of online backup services
