= IFolder =

iFolder
- A screenshot of iFolder, running on macOS
- Developer: Novell
- Stable release: 3.8.0.3 / July 19, 2010; 15 years ago
- Written in: C#
- Operating system: Linux, Windows, macOS, Solaris
- Platform: Mono
- Type: File sharing
- License: GPL-2.0-only
- Website: sourceforge.net/projects/ifolder/
- Repository: sourceforge.net/p/ifolder/code/HEAD/tree/

iFolder is an open-source application, developed by Novell, Inc., intended to allow cross-platform file sharing across computer networks.

iFolder operates on the concept of shared folders, where a folder is marked as shared and the contents of the folder are then synchronized to other computers over a network, either directly between computers in a peer-to-peer fashion or through a server. This is intended to allow a single user to synchronize files between different computers (for example between a work computer and a home computer) or share files with other users (for example a group of people who are collaborating on a project).

The core of the iFolder is actually a project called Simias. It is Simias which actually monitors files for changes, synchronizes these changes and controls the access permissions on folders. The actual iFolder clients (including a graphical desktop client and a web client) are developed as separate programs that communicate with the Simias back-end.

== History ==
Originally conceived and developed at PGSoft before the company was taken over by Novell in 2000, iFolder was announced by Novell on March 19, 2001, and released on June 29, 2001 as a software package for Windows NT/2000 and Novell NetWare 5.1 or included with the forthcoming Novell NetWare 6.0. It also included the ability to access shared files through a web browser.

iFolder Professional Edition 2, announced on March 13, 2002 and released a month later, added support for Linux and Solaris and web access support for Windows CE and Palm OS. This edition was also designed to share files between millions of users in large companies, with increased reporting features for administrators. In 2003 iFolder won a Codie award.

On March 22, 2004, after their purchase of the Linux software companies Ximian and SUSE, Novell announced that they were releasing iFolder as an open source project under the GPL license. They also announced that the open source version of iFolder would use the Mono framework in an effort to ease development.

iFolder 3.0 was released on June 22, 2005.

On March 31, 2006, Novell announced that iFolder Enterprise Server is now Open Source.

On April 2, 2009, Novell released iFolder 3.7.2 which included a Mac client for 10.4 and 10.5 as well as a Windows Vista client. In addition to the improved client lineup this version supports SSL, LDAPGroup Support, Auto-account creation, iFolder Merge, and Enhanced web access and administration. The iFolder.com website has been completely redesigned with no references to the earlier versions.

On Nov 25, 2009, Novell released iFolder 3.8

== See also ==
- Comparison of file hosting services
- Comparison of file synchronization software
- Comparison of online backup services
