= SparkleShare =

Cloud storage and file synchronization client app

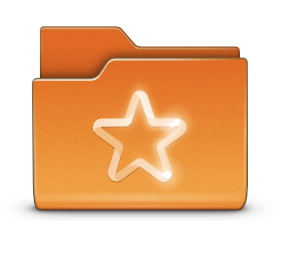
- Stable release: 3.38.1 / 20 September 2024; 6 months ago
- Repository: github.com/hbons/SparkleShare
- Written in: C#
- Operating system: Windows, Linux
- Available in: English
- Type: Online backup service
- License: GPLv3+
- Website: sparkleshare.org

SparkleShare is an open-source cloud storage and file synchronization client app. By default, it uses Git as a storage backend. SparkleShare is comparable to Dropbox, but the cloud storage can be provided by the user's own server, or a hosted solution such as GitHub. Advantage of self-hosting is that the user retains control over their data. In the simplest case, self-hosting only requires SSH and Git. SparkleShare's support for both Android and iOS devices is on hold due to the lack of developer resources.

== See also ==
- Comparison of file hosting services
- Comparison of file synchronization software
- Comparison of online backup services
