= @MAX SyncUp =

Proprietary file backup service

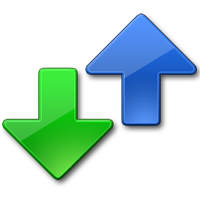

- @MAX SyncUp's "Get Started" screen
- Developer: @MAX Software
- Stable release: 6.3 build 180 / 15 March 2021; 4 years ago
- Operating system: Microsoft Windows
- Size: 2.97 MB
- Available in: English
- Type: Backup software
- License: Freeware for limited, non-commercial use Proprietary commercial software
- Website: https://www.maxsyncup.com/
- As of: November 2020

@MAX SyncUp is a free proprietary backup and file synchronization program developed by @MAX Software for Windows. It is targeted at individuals and small businesses. The software supports backup to locally writable folders, including attached USB devices, network drives and local directories. It also supports backup and synchronization to WebDAV servers, (S)FTP servers and the cloud storages such as Google Drive and Dropbox.

== License terms of use ==
Users are allowed to use free edition of the program for personal non-commercial purposes. Free edition allows using 1 fully functional backup or synchronization profile for unlimited time.

Pro-version of @MAX SyncUp has no any restrictions of the use. It provides fully functional 30-day trial period when users may use @MAX SyncUp for free for evaluation purposes.

== Features ==
@MAX SyncUp allows users to create backup copies of files and recover data from backup copies, including recovering old versions of files that have changed and files that have been destroyed. It also allows users to synchronize files between two separate locations in both directions, and to schedule backups and synchronizations.

Starting with the version 4.0 @MAX SyncUp executes synchronization using RSync-like synchronization method. Due to this method users can set up direct synchronization between two computers over the Internet without any cloud storage. RSync-like algorithm detects changes in the synchronized files and transfers only those parts of files that have been changed since the previous synchronization. It minimizes the network traffic and reduces the time required to synchronize files especially when you synchronize large files with small changes.

Also @MAX SyncUp provides the backup strategy an Apple Time Machine style when the hard links are created for unchanged files. Uncompressed backups of files are created and the file structure is retained. Hard links allow saving the disk space because of placing the same file in several folders at once. Users can manage their backups thinning old backups to keep more recent copies rather than older ones.

== Critical reception ==
The version 4.2 has been measured as “really a full featured software for backup” and the only software that comes even close to @MAX SyncUp is CrashPlan.

Reviewers complimented @MAX SyncUp's ease of use and customizability, with PC Advisor's expert review stating it "walks that fine line between power and ease of use very well". However, reviewers criticised the program's lack of cloud backup options: it is limited to Google Drive which has 15 GB of free storage.

PC Advisor gave the program 3.5 stars out of 5 to @MAX SyncUp 3.0.

== See also ==
- List of backup software
- Comparison of file synchronization software
- Comparison of online backup services
