= SeaTable =

No-code platform allowing to implement business processes

- Developer: SeaTable GmbH / Seafile Ltd.
- Initial release: 2020; 5 years ago
- Stable release: 6.0.10 / November 4, 2025; 6 days ago
- Repository: github.com/seatable/seatable
- Written in: Python, React + JavaScript
- Website: seatable.com

SeaTable is a no-code platform that allows users to develop and implement business processes. The cloud collaboration service SeaTable is marketed by the GmbH of the same name with headquarters in Mainz and additional offices in Berlin and Beijing, and developed by the same company as Seafile.

== History ==
SeaTable is a collaborative database and low-code application platform developed as part of a joint venture between Seafile Ltd., a software company based in Guangzhou, China, and SeaTable GmbH, a German firm headquartered in Mainz. Founded in 2020, the project represents the international expansion of Seafile, a Chinese developer originally known for its file synchronization and sharing software. While SeaTable's cloud services and European client operations are managed by the German entity, the platform itself is developed in China by Seafile's engineering team. This cross-border structure, described by TechCrunch as an “unconventional path” for a Chinese startup expanding abroad, reflects Seafile's effort to maintain its product development in China while addressing growing scrutiny in Western markets over data governance and corporate control.

In 2021, an innovation project led by the Cyber Innovation Hub at the IT School of the German Armed Forces started to evaluate the possibilities of a large-scale deployment at the German Armed Forces. The evaluation project is currently still ongoing.

In 2022, SeaTable is optimizing its database backend to allow millions of records within one base in the future. The focus of development is increasingly on automation and visualization.

In 2025, SeaTable introduced AI-powered automations with version 6. The update enabled the integration of large language models (LLMs) for text analysis and automated decision-making. SeaTable operates a self-hosted LLM on servers provided by Hetzner (Germany), while self-hosted deployments can connect to any compatible model.

== Features ==
SeaTable combines the traditional capabilities of a spreadsheet such as Excel and supplements them with a wide range of functions for process automation and visualization as well as a fully comprehensive API. SeaTable is not a pure cloud solution, but can alternatively be installed on a private server and operated completely autonomously. In this way, the owner retains full control over their own data. The installation is done via Docker on a Linux server.

== Security and privacy ==
While most no-code platforms exist only as SaaS solutions, SeaTable describes itself as a data-sparse European solution. While initially the SeaTable Cloud was hosted on Amazon AWS, the move to the German data centers of Swiss provider Exoscale then took place in May 2021. This was followed by the replacement of the Freshdesk cloud ticketing system with a self-hosted Zammad instance, and since April 2022 SeaTable has completely dispensed with all tracking cookies on its website.

== See also ==
- Airtable
