= Diino =

- Developer(s): Diino Systems AB
- Initial release: 2004
- Operating system: Windows 2000 and later, macOS, Linux, Android, iPhone, iPad
- Available in: English, Swedish
- License: Proprietary
- Website: diino.com

Diino was a cloud storage provider offering online backup data storage and file sharing. The company, Diino Systems AB, was founded 2004 and was based Stockholm, Sweden, with sales offices in Atlanta, London, and Mexico City. Its owners include Swisscom.

The service ran on Windows, Mac, Linux, Android, and iOS platforms, and it allowed users to create simple automated rules for protecting data by moving it into a Diino account. The service was offered directly to consumers and SME:s, but also indirectly with a white label solution via partners such as telecom operators, ISP:s and large consumer brands.

In 2012, the service was later taken over by Swiss Picture Bank with the intention to continue to run the service as before but now via the new Swedish company, New Diino AB. New Diino AB was declared bankrupt in September 2019.

== See also ==
- Comparison of online backup services
