= Steek (company) =

- Company type: Private
- Industry: Technology
- Founded: 2002
- Defunct: 2011
- Fate: Merged
- Headquarters: Bordeaux, France
- Key people: Christophe Camborde, Chairman and managing director, Founder; Yannick Lacastaigneratte, Chief Operating Officer, Founder; Arnaud Roudsovsky, Research & Development Director, Founder
- Number of employees: 40
- Website: steek.com

Steek was a private technology startup based in France. Its services included online file hosting, file sharing, and automated backup services to telecom operators, ISPs, and portals.

== History ==
Steek was founded in 2001 to develop data management products for the individuals and for small and medium-sized businesses (Small office/home office/SOHO market). The company spent the first two years in research and development.

In 2004, Steek launched its first product targeted at the SOHO market, Yellow Backup, as a data management service using broadband networks.

In 2005, Steek developed a service for the customers of a telecom network, a data sharing tool scheduled for implementation at Neuf Cegetel.

On February 15, 2007, Steek launched SteekR, an online storage and sharing space and provided Orange's portal Voila.fr a similar platform called "MaClé". At the end of 2007, Steek provided Netvibes a similar platform as well to be used on the site's centralized and user pages. With Orb, Steek provided online storage to allow for content streaming without using PCs. Steek partnered with PNY in order to provide additional online storage to the storage USB key bought by retail customers.

At the beginning of 2008, Steek announced that the company will operate only under the "Steek" brand name and that the Agematis name will no longer be used. In April, Steek announced a new version SteekR V2 of its online storage and sharing space.

On July 10, 2009 F-Secure announced the acquisition of Steek.

F-Secure officially discontinued SteekR service on December 31, 2011.

== Funding ==
In 2006, Steek raised a Series A round of €2.5 million from Innovacom and gets first developments with international partners.

== Products ==
Steek's products include:

- SteekUP: automated online backup.
- SteekR: online data storage, including music, photos, videos, and other data files which could be streamed or played without downloading. Users could access files with a cell phone or IP TV and could use the content in blogs and RSS feeds.

== See also ==
- File hosting service
- Comparison of file hosting services
- Comparison of online backup services
