= Pydio =

Mature open source software solution for file sharing and synchronization

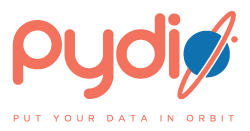

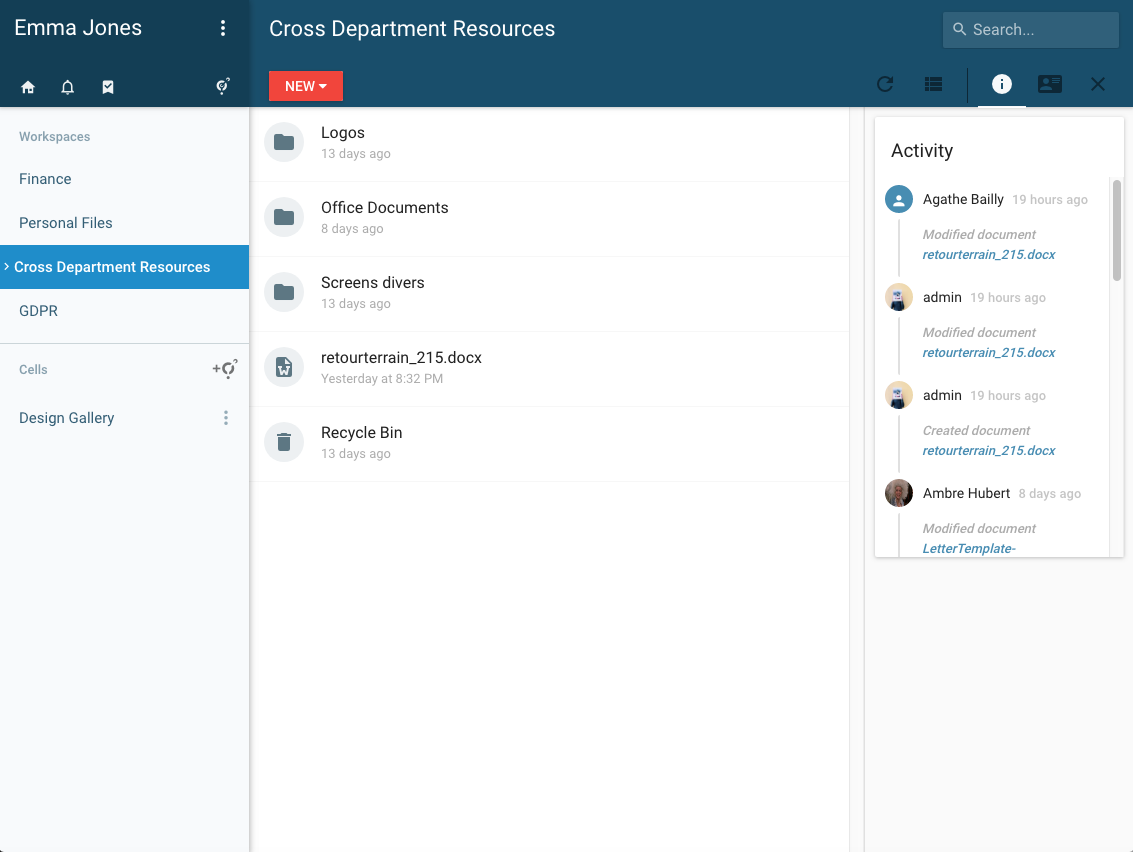
- Screenshot Pydio Cells (Browser view)
- Original author: Charles Du Jeu
- Developers: Abstrium SAS (Paris, France)
- Initial release: 16 May 2018; 7 years ago (Pydio Cells - Go version)
- Stable release: 4.4.10 (Pydio Cells - Go version); 8.2.5 (last Pydio Core PHP version)
- Repository: cells on GitHub
- Written in: Go (Pydio Cells), PHP (Pydio PHP version)
- Operating system: macOS, Windows 10, Linux
- Platform: X86-64 (Pydio Cells; ARM under development), any that runs PHP (Pydio PHP version)
- Size: Server: ~190 MB (Go version, depending on the platform)
- Available in: 11 languages
- List of languages English (UK), English (US), French, German, Italian, Japanese, Latvian, Portuguese (Brazilian), Russian, Swedish, Vietnamese
- Type: Cloud storage, File sharing, Data synchronization
- License: GNU AGPLv3.0
- Website: pydio.com

Pydio Cells, previously known as just Pydio and formerly known as AjaXplorer, is an open-source file-sharing and synchronisation software that runs on the user's own server or in the cloud.

== Presentation ==
The project was created by musician Charles Du Jeu (current CEO and CTO) in 2007 under the name AjaXplorer. The name was changed in 2013 and became Pydio (an acronym for Put Your Data in Orbit). In May 2018, Pydio switched from PHP to Go with the release of Pydio Cells. The PHP version reached end-of-life state on 31 December 2019.

Pydio Cells runs on any server supporting a recent Go version. Windows/Linux/macOS on the Intel architecture are directly supported; a fully functional working ARM implementation is under active development.

Pydio Cells has been developed from scratch using the Go programming language; release 4.0.0 introduced code refactoring to fully support the Go modular structure as well as grid computing. Nevertheless, the web-based interface of Cells is very similar to the one from Pydio 8 (in PHP), and it successfully replicates most of its features, while adding a few more. There is also a new synchronisation client (also written in Go). The PHP version has been phased out as the company's focus is moving to Pydio Cells, with community feedback on the new features. According to the company, the switch to the new environment was made "to overcome inherent PHP limitations and provide you with a future-proof and modern solution for collaborating on documents".

From a technical point of view, Pydio differs from solutions such as Google Drive or Dropbox. Pydio is not based on a public cloud; instead, the software connects to the user's existing storage (such as SAN / Local FS, SAMBA / CIFS, (s)FTP, NFS, S3-compatible cloud storage, Azure Blob Storage, Google Cloud Storage) as well as to the existing user directories (LDAP / AD, OAuth2 / OIDC SSO, SAML / Azure ADFS SSO, RADIUS, Shibboleth...), which allows companies to keep their data inside their infrastructure, according to their data security policy and user rights management.

The software is built in a modular perspective; up to Pydio 8, various plugins allowed administrators to implement extra features.

On the server side, Pydio Cells is deployed as a collection of independent microservices communicating among themselves using gRPC and logging user actions via Activity Streams 2.0 (AS2). Pydio Cells microservices are built with the Go Micro framework (using an embedded NATS server). A standard installation will deploy all required services on the same physical server, but for the purposes of performance, reliability and high availability, these can now be spread across several different servers (even in geographically separate locations) according to the 12-factors architecture pattern.

Pydio Cells is available either through a free and open-source community distribution (Pydio Cells Home), or a commercially-licensed enterprise distribution (in two variants, Pydio Cells Connect and Pydio Cells Enterprise), which add features not available in the community distribution as well as additional levels of support beyond the community forums.

== Features ==
- File sharing between different internal users and across other Pydio instances
- SSL/TLS Encryption
- WebDAV file server
- Creation of dedicated workspaces, for each line of business / project / client, with a dedicated user rights management for each workspace.
- File-sharing with external users (private links, public links, password protection, download limitation, etc.)
- Online viewing and editing of documents with Collabora Office (Pydio Cells Enterprise also offers OnlyOffice integration)
- Preview and editing of image files
- Integrated audio and video reader
- Activity stream ('timeline') for all actions taken by users
- Integrated chat platform

Client applications are available for all major desktop and mobile platforms.

== See also ==
- Comparison of file synchronization software
