= KeepVault =

- Developer(s): KeepVault
- Initial release: November 2006; 18 years ago
- Stable release: 4.20 / 12 September 2013; 11 years ago
- Operating system: Windows 8, Windows 7, Vista, Windows XP, Windows Home Server, Windows Server Essentials, Windows Server
- Available in: English
- Type: Online backup service
- License: Trialware
- Website: keepvault.com

KeepVault is an online backup service to perform online and local backups of Windows-based personal computers and servers. KeepVault uses a storage-based pricing model which allows it to offer unlimited users and devices under one account. The KeepVault technology uses end-to-end encryption and files can be accessed from other computers or via the web.

== History ==
KeepVault was first created by Proxure in 2006. In January 2012 Proxure was acquired by AuthenTec, Inc. Following AuthenTec, Inc.’s acquisition by Apple, Inc., KeepVault was acquired by a group of the original developers and became an independent company.

== Products ==
Keepvault offers a Windows desktop application and a Windows Server Add-in, and has two plan types (Home and Professional) as well as free local backup.

== OEM Distribution ==
In 2007 KeepVault was an early OEM vendor for backup when Microsoft launched Windows Home Server. KeepVault was shipped on the HP Data Vault and HP Mediasmart servers.

Starting in 2013, the KeepVault Dashboard Add-in is preinstalled on the Western Digital Sentinel server series.

== Backup Awareness Week ==
As a joint business and community effort KeepVault launched Backup Awareness Week in May of 2014. “Backup Week” is designed to educate the public about the risks of data loss, and ways to protect their data.

== Criticism ==
In 2008 bloggers complained about the end of unlimited data plans. Since then KeepVault has taken the position that unlimited plans are unsustainable.

== See also ==
- List of online backup services
