= Jumpshare =

Visual communication platform

- Developers: Jumpshare, Inc.
- Release: September 2012; 13 years ago
- Operating system: Microsoft Windows, MacOS, IOS
- Type: Screencast,Screenshot
- License: Proprietary
- Website: jumpshare.com

Jumpshare is a screen recording software that also supports screenshot and GIF capture. It is available as a desktop app for Windows and Mac, a mobile app for iOS, a Chrome extension, and a Web application. Jumpshare uses a freemium business model, providing free accounts with limited features and a paid subscription that includes unlimited recording time, access to Jumpshare AI, and advanced features such as captions and transcriptions, call-to-action buttons, video and audio editing, enhanced sharing options, password protection, analytics, and custom branding.

== History ==
The company was founded by Ghaus Iftikhar in October 2011. Initially, Jumpshare allowed guest users to upload and share files; signing up was later made mandatory. Jumpshare expanded the offering by introducing screenshot capture and video recording tools on August 19, 2015.

In 2026, Jumpshare announced a strategic pivot to a screen recording software and video marketing platform, marking a shift away from its original emphasis on file sharing.

== See also ==
- Cloud storage
- File sharing
- Comparison of file hosting services
- Comparison of file sharing applications
- Comparison of online backup services
