= Drop.io =

Defunct American file sharing company

- Available in: English
- Headquarters: Brooklyn, NYC
- Industry: Technology
- Parent: Facebook, Inc.
- Website: drop.io
- Launched: November 6, 2007
- Current status: Defunct, 2011

Drop.io was an online file sharing service. It allowed users to quickly create "drops", which could contain files of any type, and could be accessed via the internet, e-mail, phone, fax, and widgets. The service did not require users to sign up for an account, and each drop was private unless the creator chose to share it. Drop.io was named one of Time magazine's 50 Best Websites of 2009, and CNET Webware 100.

On October 29, 2010, Drop.io announced that the company had been purchased by Facebook, Inc. and that the service would be shutting down. Sam Lessin, one of the site's founders, would be moving to Facebook. As of 15 December 2010, the site is no longer active; the blog is also down, as of November 2011. As of 2021, https://drop.io redirects to a site owned by Chandler Systems, Inc., an Ohio-based manufacturer of residential and commercial water treatment products.

== Products ==
Drop.io's free product provided 100 megabytes of storage. Users could upgrade to 25 gigabytes of storage for an annual fee. Drop.io additionally offered a business and education-oriented service called Manager, which aimed to replace FTP systems for file sharing.

== History ==
Drop.io was founded by Sam Lessin and Darshan Somashekar in August 2007. The company's offices were originally located in Manhattan, New York City; it moved to the "DUMBO" neighborhood of Brooklyn in 2008.

Drop.io was nominated for the Technical Achievement Award at the South By Southwest 11th Annual Web Awards in 2007.

On June 10, drop.io and Scribd, announced a partnership to offer rich conversion and viewing within private "drops", in an attempt to make it easier for people to share private information online. As of 2008, users can find drop.io on a number of social networking sites, including: Facebook and Twitter.

Between March 2007 and November 2008, drop.io released a series of feature improvements to their platform including 'inputs' and 'outputs' via various interfaces like phone and fax, a Twitter 'subscription' mode, and a Firefox plugin that allows users to 'drag and drop' files into new or existing 'drops'

In September 2008, drop.io released a very simple API which allows other applications to use drop.io's file sharing ability in their own applications. Several early applications were built, including usend.io (a simple file transfer app like senduit or yousendit). Ars Technica appears to have built the first fully operational third party application on the API.

In November 2008, drop.io announced having moved 100% into 'the cloud' having switched away from all owned and rented physical hardware/servers and claimed to be the largest 100% in the cloud application in the world.

Also in November 2008, drop.io released a major design overhaul which completely changed the front end of the product, but maintained the core service.

In December 2008, drop.io was one of the first services to release a Facebook Connect integration, which allowed users to publish updates of any sort made to any drop directly to their Facebook feed

In January 2009, drop.io launched a professional product extension called drop.io manager which allowed users to create templates to pre-customize and brand drops, as well as get detailed reporting about how their drops are being used.

In March 2009, drop.io launched playlist.io one in a series of 'applets' which allow for feature customization of drop.io around various use cases

Between February 2009 and May 2009, drop.io started integrating real-time features into its file sharing backbone using XMPP. This initially included chat functionality and real-time streaming of files, but expanded in May to include a web-presentation mode.

On September 10, 2009, drop.io released Attach Large Files, a pre-installed application for all Yahoo! Mail users. The app allows users to attach an unlimited amount of files up to 100 Mb and was developed entirely on drop.io's API with their custom-built JavaScript library.

== Funding ==
In November 2007, drop.io completed a $1.2 million Series A round of financing led by RRE Ventures to support the company's development efforts and infrastructure growth. In March 2008, the company closed $2.7 million in series A-1 financing led by New York venture capital firms DFJ Gotham and RRE Ventures.

== People ==
- Sam Lessin, CEO
- Christine Hunsicker, COO
- Steven Greenwood, VP of business development
- Jacob Robbins, head of development
- Lee Azzarello, systems architect

== See also ==
- YouSendIt
- Dropbox
- Box.net
- Hotfile
- ZumoDrive
- Ubuntu One
