= Gladinet =

Gladinet Cloud Desktop
- Developer(s): Gladinet, Inc.
- Initial release: May 2009
- Stable release: Gladinet Cloud Release History
- Operating system: Windows
- Available in: English
- Type: Cloud storage desktop integration
- License: Proprietary
- Website: www.gladinet.com

Gladinet, Inc. is an American corporation co-founded by Jerry Huang and Franklyn Peart in 2008 in Lake Worth, Florida. The company provides cloud computing software, including an on-premises, enterprise file synchronization and sharing (EFSS) platform. The on-premises version of the platform is available for service providers and enterprises. There is also a team edition.

Gladinet Cloud Enterprise provides enterprise file sync and share with on-premises deployment. The orchestration layer can integrate with on-premises storage platforms like OpenStack Swift. The platform adds traditional IT security and controls to file sync and share use cases, allowing remote access to existing data from any device with existing identities. It provides software, with distributed file locking, and sync-on-demand.

== History ==
The company was initially founded to integrate cloud services directly onto PC desktops on the Internet. The company believed that this approach was better than using a web browser like Internet Explorer or Firefox as a cloud client.

Gladinet implemented a ubiquitous cloud storage client that integrated cloud storage with the Windows file system. Gladinet Cloud Desktop also created file type associations between web applications and files, whether they were stored on a local disk or in the cloud. It supports services such as Google Docs and includes Amazon's Cloud Drive.

== Products ==
CentreStack, previously Gladinet Cloud Enterprise, is a secure self-hosted file sharing platform.

Cloud Desktop is a tool that integrates cloud storage with backup and file synchronization options all from a desktop. Just like a local drive, it allows users to access online storage as a folder on a PC or computer system.

== See also ==
- List of online backup services
