= Yandex Disk =

Russian cloud service launched in 2012

Yandex.Disk
- Developer: Yandex
- Initial release: April 2012; 14 years ago
- Operating system: Microsoft Windows macOS; Linux iOS; Android; Windows Phone; Symbian
- Available in: English, Russian, Turkish, Ukrainian
- Type: Online backup service
- License: Freeware
- Website: disk.yandex.com

Yandex.Disk (Russian: Яндекс.Диск, romanized: Yandeks.Disk) is a cloud service created by Yandex that lets users store files on “cloud” servers and share them with others online. The service is based on syncing data between different devices. Yandex.Disk was launched in English in June 2012.

== Features ==
Storage: users can upload and save files. There are no restrictions on the length of time files can be stored. All files are uploaded over an encrypted connection and are checked by an antivirus.

Syncing: files are synced between all the user's internet-enabled devices either through the web interface or the Yandex.Disk mobile/desktop application.

Sharing: users can share file download links with others.

Preview: the built-in flash player lets people preview songs.

Integration with other Yandex services: lets people manage their files on other Yandex services such as Yandex.Mail and Yandex.Narod. All sent and received mail attachments are automatically placed in one folder and can easily be searched.

WebDAV support: means that files can be managed with any application supporting the WebDAV protocol. The Yandex.Disk API can be used in any software program supporting WebDAV.

Since October 18, 2019, Yandex.Disk has started throttling WebDAV, causing some clients to time out, the official page redirects to the Yandex.Disk 3.0 client page, support writes, "Yandex.Disk is a personal service that is not designed to be used as an infrastructure element. For such tasks, we have Yandex.Cloud."

== Supported platforms ==
The web version is located inside Yandex.Mail under the "Files" tab.

There are desktop applications available for the following operating systems:

- Windows XP SP3, Windows Vista, Windows 7, Windows 10
- macOS
- command line version for Linux

The mobile version is available as its own app for:

- iOS
- Android

It lets users view files on Yandex.Disk, upload files from their mobile device, download files for use offline and email file download links.

== Yandex.Disk API ==
The Yandex.Disk API makes it easier to sync info between smartphones, tablet PCs, laptops and desktop computers.

The API lets developers:

- manage Yandex.Disk user files
- store files created by developers’ own software
- store application settings and use them on any internet-enabled device

The Yandex.Disk API Documentation was released on April 28, 2012.

== Storage ==
The service is provided completely free of charge. Everyone starts off with a free allowance of 5GB, which can be increased by 512 Mb increments by referring others to an additional maximum of 10 GB for 20 GB in total. Also, additional storage can be paid for on a monthly or yearly basis.

Users can choose to enable device auto-uploads using the Yandex.Disk App on Android and iOS for an additional 32 GB of free storage. This increases the maximum storage from 10 GB to 42 GB.

== History ==
April 5, 2012 – the beta version of the service was launched.

May 3, 2012 – the first API and open source client are launched.

May 24, 2012 – a flash player was introduced to the web interface and a “Save to my Disk” button was added to the shared file page, which allows users to share files published by others to their account.

June 26, 2012 – English and Turkish versions available.

== See also ==
- Yandex
- Cloud computing
- Comparison of file hosting services
- Comparison of online backup services
