= Syncdocs =

File synchronization Software

- Developer(s): Syncdocs
- Stable release: Syncdocs 6.901 / January 10, 2017; 8 years ago
- Operating system: Windows
- Type: Backup software
- License: Commercial proprietary, shareware version available
- Website: www.syncdocs.com

Syncdocs is backup and file synchronization software for Google Drive. Syncdocs uses cloud computing to enable users to back up and synchronize Windows computer files to Google Documents and Google Drive accounts. Since End of 2024 Syncdocs is no longer working.

== Features ==
- Full data migration to and from Google Drive cloud.
- The program supports editing of local Microsoft Office documents online using Google Docs.
- The Windows folder structure is replicated online.
- Ability to sync network folders and external USB drives to Google Drive.
- Up to 16 accounts can be synced to Google Drive concurrently.
- Synchronization of file and folder changes and contacts between Google and local computers.
- Compression Support.
- End-to-End Google Drive Encryption using 256 bit Advanced Encryption Standard
- File versioning and Unicode filename support.
- File sharing
- Drive mapping of Google Drive to a local drive letter.

The Google Drive client shares some of the same basic features as Syncdocs. The main differences are Syncdocs ability to sync multiple Google accounts concurrently and Syncdocs ability to sync any folders on the PC or network. However, Syncdocs does not have an OS X or Android client, which Google Drive does.

== See also ==
- File synchronization
- Comparison of file synchronization software
- Backup
- List of backup software
- Dropbox
- GDocsDrive
- Google Drive
