= Copyparty (software) =

File sharing software

- Developer: 9001
- Release: 1.0.0 / September 8, 2021; 5 years ago
- Stable release: 1.20.26 / October 15, 2026; 24 days ago
- Written in: Python, JavaScript
- Operating system: Cross-platform
- Type: File sharing
- License: MIT License
- Website: copyparty.eu
- Repository: github.com/9001/copyparty/

Copyparty is free and open-source file sharing software. It is distributed as a single Python file that can run without installation or dependencies which hosts a file server reachable through a web browser. It can serve files over HTTP, HTTPS, WebDAV, FTP, SFTP, TFTP and SMB/CIFS. It is released under the MIT License.

== History ==
Development started in 2019. The developer 9001, has said the software was written on a phone in their spare time, using Termux with tmux and Vim. Version 1.0.0 was released in September 2021.

== Features ==
Copyparty uses a custom upload protocol called up2k. The browser client splits a file into chunks before transfer, so that chunks the server already holds can be skipped. Identical files are deduplicated on disk using symlinks or hard links. Because file upload is chunked, failed uploads can be resumed. A file can already be downloaded while it is still being uploaded.

The web interface listens on port 3923 by default. On startup the program prints the server's address and a QR code that other devices can scan to connect. The program can also be mounted as a network drive through WebDAV, SFTP, FTP and SMB, using a file manager. The server can announce itself on the local network using zero configuration networking via mDNS and SSDP.

Permissions are set per user and per volume. A volume may be made accessible to anonymous users for reading or for uploading. Users can generate temporary links to a file or folder.

=== Portability ===
Copyparty runs on Linux, macOS, Windows, FreeBSD, Android, and single board computers such as the Raspberry Pi. Older 32-bit versions of Windows are also supported using a Windows executable. The web interface is also functional on older browsers such as Internet Explorer and runs on devices such as the PlayStation Portable and Nintendo 3DS. An Android app is available on F-Droid.

== Reception ==
Les Pounder of Tom's Hardware called Copyparty "a rather wonderful tool that turns almost any device capable of running Python into a file server". Patrick Campanale of How-To Geek wrote that the software "gets you a file server up and running in seconds", but criticised the storing of passwords in plain text and the inability of users to change their own passwords.

== See also ==
- Comparison of file synchronization software
