= Seafile =

Open-source, cross-platform file-hosting software system

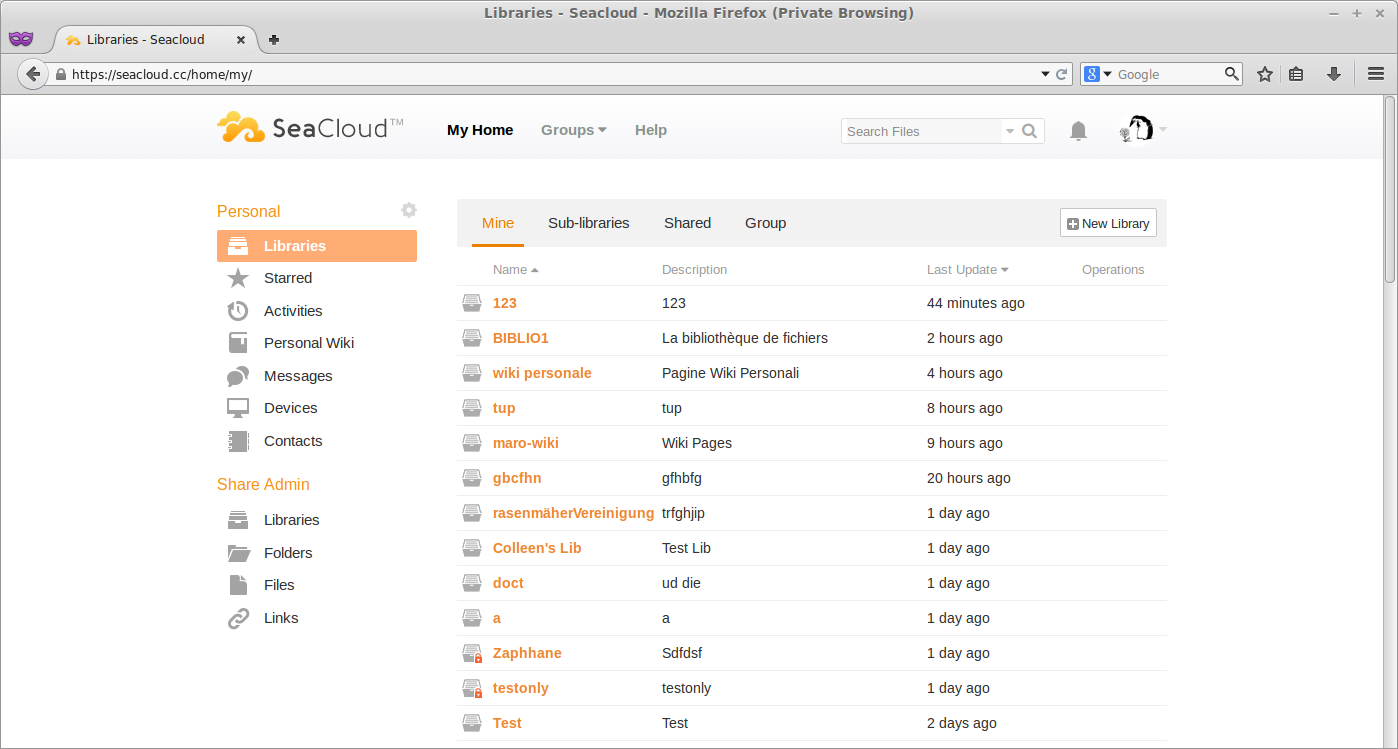
- Seafile web client
- Developer: Seafile Ltd.
- Stable release: 13.0.25 (13 July 2026; 38 days ago) [±]
- Written in: C, Python
- Operating system: Cross-platform
- Type: Cloud storage Data synchronization
- License: GPLv2 (Community Edition)
- Website: www.seafile.com/en/home/
- Repository: github.com/haiwen/seafile

Seafile is an open-source, cross-platform file-hosting software system. Files are stored on a central server and can be synchronized with personal computers and mobile devices through apps. Files on the Seafile server can also be accessed directly via the server's web interface. Seafile's functionality is similar to other popular file hosting services such as Dropbox and Google Drive. The primary difference between Seafile and Dropbox/Google Drive is that Seafile is a self-hosted file sharing solution for private cloud applications. In private clouds, storage space and client connection limits are determined exclusively by the users' own infrastructure and settings rather than the terms and conditions of a cloud service provider. Additionally, organizations whose data privacy policies bar them from using public cloud services can draw on Seafile to build a file sharing system of their own.

== History ==
In 2009, Daniel Pan and other former students of Tsinghua University, Beijing embarked on a project aiming at building a peer-to-peer file sharing software. Seafile was the name chosen for their software project. The development team decided in 2010 to abandon this initial goal and refocussed on building a file syncing software with a more traditional client-server architecture – the architecture also used by Dropbox and other file hosting service providers.

In 2012, Daniel Pan, Jonathan Xu and other key developers of the project established Seafile Ltd. with the objective to develop and distribute the file hosting software.

At the beginning of 2015, the distribution company Seafile GmbH was founded by Silja and Alexander Jackson to promote Seafile in Germany. Seafile Ltd., which did not take an equity stake in Seafile GmbH, granted usage rights for the Seafile brand and provided funding in the form of an interest free loan to the new company. The partnership was abruptly terminated in July 2016 due to disagreements between the two companies over, among other things, product development and intellectual property rights. An amicable resolution to the dispute was reached in March 2017. The Mainz-based company datamate GmbH & Co. KG has since taken over distribution and support in Europe.

== Versions ==
Seafile server software is developed in two parallel versions, following the open-core model: a FOSS "community" version and a proprietary "professional" version with paid-for features for enterprise environments. The community edition is released under the terms of the GNU General Public License v2.

Most Seafile installations – community as well as enterprise – are private cloud installations and service a clearly defined user group, i.e., the members of an organisation. There are also some public file hosting services based on Seafile.

== Features ==
The feature set of the community and professional edition vary. Both editions share these features:

- Multi-platform file synchronisation
- Public link sharing (upload and download)
- Client-side encryption
- Per-folder access control
- Version control
- Two-factor authentication

The additional features of the professional edition include:

- File locking
- Full text search
- MS Office document preview and office web app integration
- Activity logging
- Distributed storage
- Antivirus integration

== Platforms ==
Seafile Server Community Edition can be installed on various Linux platforms. Seafile Ltd. maintains installation packages for Debian, Ubuntu, CentOS, Red Hat Enterprise Linux. Additionally, the developer provides a Docker container. A Seafile Server for Windows has been discontinued with version 6.0.7, though it is still available for download on the developer's download site. Users interested in installing Seafile on a Windows computer are referred to Docker. FreeBSD and Raspbian are two more supported platforms. Their install packages are community maintained.

Seafile Server Professional Edition is available for Debian, Ubuntu, CentOS and RHEL. A Docker image is available too. For Seafile Professional's proprietary nature, they are all maintained by Seafile Ltd.

Both servers offer only MySQL/MariaDB database support after dropping sqlite in version 11. It supports file system or distributed storage as data storage.

Desktop clients are available for personal computers running on Windows, macOS, and Linux. Mobile clients are available for iOS, Windows Phone 8 and Android. Files can also be viewed, downloaded from and uploaded to the Seafile Server without the client via Seafile's web interface.

== Disputes ==
=== Seafile Ltd and Seafile GmbH ===
In July 2016 a dispute came to light between Seafile Ltd. (the original company, from China) and Seafile GmbH (a German company established from JacksonIT by Silja Jackson and Alexander Jackson in 2015).

Seafile Ltd. had funded Seafile GmbH to be a European partner. They then agreed to merge the main operations and license the cloud provision to a new company, but an agreement could not be reached on the number of shares to be allocated.

Seafile Ltd. alleges that Seafile GmbH and its predecessors had attempted to register its trademark in the US and had taken steps to present itself in place of Seafile Ltd. Seafile Ltd. also alleges that Seafile GmbH had abused the sourcecode and were committing copyright infringements.

Seafile GmbH stated it would fork based upon the most recent professional version and continue developing the file sharing software independently under the brand name Seafile, for which the company claims it hold the intellectual property rights in Europe and North America. Seafile GmbH has not released a new Seafile server version since the announcement.

In March 2017, it was announced that an amicable resolution to the dispute between Seafile Ltd. and Seafile GmbH had been reached. All Seafile trademarks held by Seafile GmbH and the domain “seafile.de” will be transferred to Seafile Ltd.. Seafile GmbH will continue to do business and change its name to Syncwerk GmbH. Syncwerk GmbH will continue to provide software updates and support, as well as SaaS services to their existing customers, based on Seafile Professional Edition 5.1.8. New customers who are interested in purchasing Seafile Professional Edition need to contact Seafile Ltd.. Seafile GmbH / Syncwerk GmbH will no longer offer the Seafile Professional Edition (or software derived from it) to new customers who first contacted them after March 10, 2017.

=== PayPal ===
In June 2016 Seafile GmbH had its payment services from PayPal removed. PayPal had accused Seafile of facilitating the illegal sharing of files and demanded that they monitor file transfers and provide statistical information to PayPal, which Seafile refused to do. Some days later, PayPal reversed its decision and apologised to Seafile, but Seafile said they would drop PayPal in favour of other payment options.

== See also ==
- Nextcloud (FOSS client-server software for file storage and transfer)
- Comparison of file hosting services
- Comparison of file synchronization software
- Comparison of online backup services
