= CloudMe =

File storage service

- Developer: CloudMe AB
- Release: April 2011
- Stable release: 1.9.3
- Operating system: Microsoft Windows; Mac OS 10.4 and later Linux iOS; Android; Google TV; Samsung Smart TV; WD TV; NAS: Windows Storage Server
- Available in: English, German, Spanish, Portuguese, Italian, P, Finnish, Swedish, Japanese, Korean, Simplified Chinese, Traditional Chinese
- Type: Online backup service Web application
- License: Proprietary software (Windows, Mac and Linux clients)
- Website: cloudme.com

CloudMe is a file storage service operated by CloudMe AB that offers cloud storage, file synchronization and client software. It features a blue folder that appears on all devices with the same content, all files are synchronized between devices. The CloudMe service is offered with a freemium business model and provides an encrypted SSL connection with an SSL Extended Validation Certificate. CloudMe provides client software for Microsoft Windows, macOS, Linux, Android, iOS, Google TV, Samsung Smart TV, WD TV, Windows Storage Server for NAS and web browsers.

As a cloud sync storage provider, CloudMe has a strong focus on the European market and differentiates itself from other storage providers with mobility and media features like Samsung SmartTV support.

Recently Novell announced support for the CloudMe service in their Dynamic File Services Suite. Novosoft Handy Backup version 7.3 also announced support for CloudMe. WinZip is also integrated with CloudMe. There are many third party mobile apps and software available for CloudMe, many using the WebDAV support of CloudMe.

== History ==
CloudMe was founded by Daniel Arthursson in 2012 and is mainly owned by Xcerion. The company runs its own servers and operates from Sweden. In 2012 CloudMe received the Red Herring Top 100 Global company, AlwaysON Global 250 award, White Bull 2012 Yearling Award and the White Bull 2014 Longhorn Award.

Previously CloudMe.com was called iCloud.com, but the service changed name after Apple acquired the domain and trademark for a rumoured 4.5 million dollars. For a while visitors to icloud.com were directed to cloudme.com. After the name change, the former iCloud.com service was split into two companies and services, CloudMe for file sync and storage, and CloudTop as the virtual cloud desktop that previously was the main attraction of the iCloud.com service and included file storage. Xcerion, the major owner of CloudMe and CloudTop initially gained an investment of $12 million to build the iCloud service.

Using a SaaS model, the CloudMe service is provided in a free version (3 GB storage up to 19 GB with referral program), a model often called freemium, and premium versions with either 10, 25, 100, 200, 500 GB storage for consumers, 2 TB and 5 TB for business. The closest competitor to CloudMe is Dropbox.

== Features ==
CloudMe features a Cloud storage and sync solution that allows the users to store, access and share their content, both with each other and with people outside the service. Sharing can be done by email, text messaging, Facebook and Google. Files can be stored in a blue folder, which is synchronized to all connected computers and devices. A web desktop and cloud OS service called CloudTop.com is available that uses CloudMe as its internet file system.

== Headquarters ==
CloudMe AB is located on Drottninggatan 23 in Linköping, Sweden.

== See also ==
- Comparison of file hosting services
- Comparison of file synchronization software
- Comparison of online backup services
