= Axway Software =

Information technology company

- Type: Société Anonyme
- Traded as: Euronext: AXW; CAC All-Share
- Industry: Information Technology
- Founded: 2000
- Headquarters: Scottsdale, Arizona, U.S.
- Key people: Roland Royer (CEO)
- Products: Axway Amplify platform
- Revenue: ▼€314.0 million (2022)
- Net income: ▲€8.5 million (2016)
- Number of employees: 1,888 (2020)
- Website: axway.com

Axway Software is a French-American publicly held information technology company that provides software tools for enterprise software, enterprise application integration, business activity monitoring, business analytics, mobile application development and web API management.

Since it split from parent company Sopra Steria in June 2011, Axway has been listed on Euronext Paris (AXW).

== History ==
Axway Software was incorporated on 28 December 2000 when the software infrastructure division of the French IT services company Sopra was spun-out as a subsidiary. (Sopra subsequently merged with another French IT services company Steria to form Sopra Steria in 2014.)

Sopra used Axway as a vehicle for expansion into the Enterprise Application Integration market. Subsequently, a number of acquisitions have been made by Axway. The Swedish company Viewlocity was acquired in early 2002.

Christophe Fabre became CEO of Axway in 2005 and remained in that position until 2015. Axway acquired the US company Cyclone Commerce in January 2006 after which much of the executive management of Axway relocated to Phoenix, Arizona. In February 2007, Axway acquired the Atos's B2B software business in Germany. US company Tumbleweed Communications was acquired in June 2008.

In June 2011, Axway was spun out of Sopra Group and listed on the Paris Euronext. In November 2012, the Irish company Vordel, an API Management vendor, was acquired. The Brazilian company, SCI Soluções, was acquired in September 2013. In January 2014, Axway acquired the assets of Information Gateway in Australia. Axway acquired French company Systar, a developer of Business Activity Monitoring software, in June 2014.

In January 2016, Axway acquired US company Appcelerator, creator of the Appcelerator Titanium open-source framework for multiplatform native mobile app development. Axway acquired US company Syncplicity, developer of a file share and synchronization service, in February 2017.

In July 2017, Axway was selected by SEA (Società Esercizi Aeroportuali), the operator of Milan's Malpensa and Linate airports, to implement its API Management solution as part of the Axway AMPLIFY platform.

As of 2017, Sopra Steria holds 33.52% of Axway and Sopra GMT, a holding company for Sopra Steria and Axway, holds 21.65%. In May 2016, Sopra Steria acquired the 8.62% stake in Axway formerly held by Société Générale. Axway is a component of the CAC Small.

In 2016, Axway had more than 11,000 customers in 100 countries. Since going public in 2011, annual revenues have grown from €217.2 million in 2011 to €301.1 million in 2016, and profits have grown from €35.3 million in 2011 to €50.8 million in 2016.

In September 2024, Axway acquired Sopra Banking Software, a French banking software company, in a transaction valued at €330 million. Following the acquisition, Sopra Banking Software became part of the Axway Group as a separate business unit, and Axway CEO Patrick Donovan became the head of the combined entity. In October 2024, Sopra Banking Software was rebranded as SBS.

== Products and services ==
=== Main products ===
- The Amplify platform, which acts as a data integration platform for a number of formerly independent legacy products, including Appcelerator Titanium. It provides a more uniform user interface to the various components.
- Cross File Transfer
- Syncplicity

== Company locations ==
Axway is headquartered in Phoenix, Arizona and Puteaux, Paris. The company has development centers in France in Lyon and Paris, in Romania in Bucharest, in Bulgaria in Sofia and in the United States in Scottsdale, Arizona and Santa Clara, California. It also has various support centers, including one in Noida, India.

The acquisition of SCI in 2013 lead to the establishment of the Axway South America regional headquarters in São Paulo, Brazil.
