= Norton Zone =

- Developer: Symantec
- Release: Beta: November 29, 2012; General Release: May 14, 2013
- Operating system: Windows, Windows RT, Android, macOS, iOS
- Type: Online backup service
- License: Proprietary software
- Website: https://www.nortonzone.com

Norton Zone was a cloud file sharing and online backup tool service operated by Symantec that can be used to share, sync, access, store, and backup data. It also allows for file collaboration with commenting. Norton Zone is accessible through apps for Windows, Windows RT, Android, Mac, and iOS platforms. Norton Zone uses encrypted and replicated cloud storage and provides client-side encryption.

As a leading AntiVirus provider via its Norton AntiVirus software, Symantec distinguishes Norton Zone from competition by automatically scanning files for malware and viruses.

Norton Zone offered 5 GB of storage for free and larger storage allocations via subscription.

On June 3, 2014, Symantec announced that Norton Zone would be discontinued on August 6, 2014.
