= Unitrends =

American business services company

Unitrends Corporation
- Company type: Private
- Industry: Information technology
- Founded: 1989
- Headquarters: Burlington, Massachusetts, United States
- Products: Backup and disaster recovery appliances and related products
- Number of employees: 250
- Website: unitrends.com

Unitrends Inc., a Kaseya company, is an American company specializing in backup and business continuity.

== Products ==
Unitrends produces several physical appliances, ranging from small desktop backup appliances to large rack-mounted backup appliances. Unitrends also produces virtual appliances for VMware and Hyper-V marketed as Unitrends Backup. The physical appliances typically consist of some level of redundant components; most notably RAID in the form of RAID 1, RAID 6, and RAID 10. The larger appliances also have tiered flash storage in the form of SSD drives. These appliances perform either on-premises backup, off-premises disaster recovery, or through a technology known as cross-vaulting (a form of replication) an appliance may concurrently perform on-premises backup and off-premises disaster recovery. Unitrends also offers a multi-tenant public cloud-based service, Unitrends Cloud. The company states that Unitrends Cloud is based on its previous product offering using its backup appliances to perform off-premises disaster recovery in a single-tenant private cloud deployment methodology.

== Technology ==
Unitrends uses file-and-image-based backup techniques coupled with storage-based and in-flight AES-256 encryption, compression, data deduplication, and ransomware detection. The technology supports Bare-Metal restore as well as file-based recovery. Unitrends supports a form of disk staging in what it terms D2D2x (Disk-to-Disk-to-Any) where “x” can be a disk, a tape, a private single-tenant cloud, or a public multi-tenant cloud. The company attempts to sell its support of storage, operating system, and application heterogeneity and claims that it supports over 250 versions of operating systems and applications.

== History ==
Since its inception in 1989, Unitrends Software Corporation has developed backup and crash-recovery technology. Unitrends originated from a sole proprietorship called Med Flex, which was founded in 1985 by Steve W. Schwartz to help fund medical missions. The first product, CTAR (Compressing Tape Archiver), was originally developed to handle the backup problems Schwartz encountered in his own medical office. After making modifications to the program, it was sold commercially.

In 1988, Unitrends developed the first complete crash-recovery product for Santa Cruz Operation’s Xenix systems, originally called Jet RestorEase. Unitrends started as a standalone Unix backup software company and provided BareMetal recovery for platforms like the SCO offerings. BareMetal was later ported to SCO Unix and renamed System Crash Air-Bag. From 1988 to 1991, ten other software products were written for the Xenix and Unix environments, and in 1999, Unitrends released their Backup Professional client/server backup software. In September 2002, Unitrends shipped their first hardware-based backup appliance.

Initially based out of Myrtle Beach, South Carolina, the company relocated its headquarters further inland to Columbia in November 2003, while support and development remained on the coast until 2005. In 2014, headquarters moved again to Burlington, Massachusetts. where it remains today.

== Growth and acquisition ==
On October 31, 2013, Unitrends was acquired by Insight Venture Partners, a large global private equity and venture capital firm. Shortly after this acquisition, Unitrends obtained PHD Virtual on December 16, 2013. Unitrends acquired another company on May 29, 2014, taking over Australian-based Yuruware. On May 3, 2018, Unitrends merged with Kaseya.
