= RepliWeb =

RepliWeb Inc.
- Type: Private
- Industry: Computer Software
- Founded: 2000; 26 years ago
- Headquarters: Coconut Creek, Florida, United States
- Products: See Products
- Website: www.qlik.com

RepliWeb, Inc. is a computer software manufacturer that develops Web content deployment, file synchronization, managed file transfer, and SharePoint application lifecycle services. Its headquarters is in Coconut Creek, Florida, with other office locations in London, United Kingdom and Petah-Tikva, Israel.

== Company history ==
RepliWeb was founded in 2000 to provide services for distributed file replication and Web application deployment automation. In 2005, RepliWeb acquired Softlink Ltd, adding various products such as file transfer system to its portfolio.

In September 2011, RepliWeb was acquired for $7.8 million by Attunity (Nasdaq: ATTU), a Boston, Massachusetts–based developer of data management.

In May 2019, Attunity was acquired by Qlik Technologies Inc., based in King of Prussia, PA.
