= Egnyte =

American software company

Egnyte, Inc.
- Type: Private
- Industry: Technology; Cloud software Cloud content security
- Founded: 2007; 19 years ago
- Founders: Vineet Jain; Rajesh Ram; Kris Lahiri; Amrit Jassal
- Headquarters: Mountain View, California, USA
- Key people: Vineet Jain (CEO)
- Parent: GI Partners; TA Associates
- ASN: 55125
- Website: www.egnyte.com

Egnyte is an American software company that sells cloud-based content security, compliance, and collaboration tools for businesses. Founded in 2007, it is headquartered in Mountain View, California.

Originally focused on modernized file servers, the firm it has since shifted to selling tools that help users securely collaborate with coworkers and third parties.

== History ==
Incorporated only in 2008, Egnyte is a privately held company founded a year earlier by Vineet Jain, Rajesh Ram, Kris Lahiri, and Amrit Jassal. It received $1 million seed venture capital in 2007, $6 million in July 2009, $10 million in 2011, and $16 million in 2012.

The firm announced a $29.5 million investment in 2013 that included Seagate, CenturyLink, Northgate Capital, and prior investors Kleiner Perkins, Google Ventures and Polaris Partners. In 2018, it has raised $137.5 million, including $75 million in Series E funding in 2018, led by Goldman Sachs.

By the end of 2019, the company reported having more than 16,000 customers worldwide, and it had reached more than $100 million in annual recurring revenue.

Egnyte initially sold cloud and on-premises file servers but later added features for collaboration and security and shifted its focus to cloud content governance for businesses. In 2020, it combined its two primary products—Egnyte Protect and Egnyte Connect—into one platform to manage, govern, and secure data.

Also in 2020, the former CFO of Napster, Suzanne Colvin, took on the same role at Egnyte after it had been vacant for a long time since Steve Sutter's departure. Two years later, in addition to reports of its interest in going public (IPO), it was announced that a former FireEye executive VP, Alexa King, would serve as a board director.

In February 2025, it was announced that GI Partners and TA Associates had become majority shareholders of the company after making a large investment in Egnyte.

== Features ==
The Egnyte platform provides content security, compliance, and collaboration capabilities to govern content. Egnyte's software can be used to scan a range of data repositories for malware—including email, on-premises storage, and third-party cloud storage—and block ransomware attacks from spreading. Egnyte also has a Governance Risk Dashboard that analyzes an organization's risk level and provides feedback on areas of improvement.

Egnyte's collaboration features include cloud storage, as well as co-editing of files in Microsoft 365 and Google Workspace. Egnyte uses machine learning to predictably cache files for faster local access and to automatically categorize sensitive content.

Egnyte integrates with a number of business productivity tools, including Box, OneDrive, DropBox, Slack, Microsoft 365, Google Workspace, AWS, and Salesforce. It also sells industry-specific software to the construction and life sciences industries.

Egnyte offers tiered pricing plans with varying capabilities. For example, all of its SaaS subscribers get ransomware protection against 2,000 known threats and file versioning, while enterprise customers have access to file restoration and abnormal activity detection features.

== See also ==
- Cloud storage
- Comparison of file synchronization software
- Content management
- File sharing
- Hybrid cloud
- On-premises software
