= Easy2Sync for Files =

- Developer(s): IT-Services Thomas Holz
- Initial release: July 2002
- Stable release: 8.03 / February 11, 2021; 4 years ago
- Written in: C++
- Operating system: Windows 10, 8.1, 7, Vista, 2003, XP
- Available in: English, German
- Type: File synchronization
- License: Commercial, Proprietary, Shareware
- Website: www.easy2sync.com/en/produkte/easy2sync.php

Easy2Sync for Files is backup and file synchronization software created for use with the Microsoft Windows environments. It allows backing up and synchronizing files between two folder trees on the same or different drives / computers, including network and USB drives and FTP servers.

== Features ==
- It has the capability to remember the previous state of directories in a database, and thus also synchronize deletions. It can also detect renamed directories.
- The program fully supports Unicode characters so that it can copy filenames in all languages.
- Includes a scheduler.
- Supports the sync over FTP.
- Versioning, the ability to keep multiple older versions of each file in the backup.
- Files / folders can be excluded from the sync by name, age or size.
- Includes modes to (instead of synchronizing) copy, move or delete files or to flatten a directory structure into a single directory.
- The program can be installed onto portable drives (USB)

== See also ==
- File synchronization
- Backup
