= Wuala =

Secure online file storage software company

- Original authors: Dominik Grolimund, Luzius Meisser
- Release: August 14, 2008; 17 years ago
- Final release: Nadelhorn / September 30, 2014; 11 years ago
- Operating system: Microsoft Windows XP, Vista, 7, 8, Linux, Mac OS X 10.4 and greater, Android, iOS
- Platform: Java
- Available in: English, German, Portuguese, French, Simplified Chinese, Spanish, Italian, Dutch
- Type: Online file storage
- License: Proprietary
- Website: www.wuala.com

Wuala /wɑːˈlɑː/ was a secure online file storage, file synchronization, versioning and backup service originally developed and run by Caleido Inc. It is now part of LaCie, which is in turn owned by Seagate Technology. The service stores files in data centres that are provided by Wuala in multiple European countries (France, Germany, Switzerland). An earlier version also supported distributed storage on other users' machines, however this feature has been dropped. On 17 August 2015 Wuala announced that it was discontinuing its service and that all stored data would be deleted on 15 November 2015. Wuala recommended a rival cloud storage startup, Tresorit, as an alternative to its remaining customers.

== History ==
Old logo for Wuala

Most research and development occurred at the Swiss Federal Institute of Technology (ETH) in Zürich.

In August 2008, Wuala launched in public beta mode; and in September of the same year, the Wuala Webstart project was registered on SourceForge.net. Later that year, an Alpha release REST API, at a very early stage of development, supported HTTP GET requests for content that was either public, or shared through a keyed hyperlink.

In 2009, LaCie announced a merger with Caleido AG. Wuala described the merger as being between Wuala and LaCie (not Caleido AG and LaCie). A post-merger announcement of the first joint products occurred in early 2010.

In 2011, all pro features - backup, sync, file versioning and time travel - are available for everyone at no cost. Later in the year, the "trade storage" feature was discontinued. In 2014, the storage plan was shifted to a paid-only service. Wuala announced that existing free-only storage would be terminated at the end of 2014 and customers wishing to save their data should migrate away or purchase a paid plan.

In August 2015, Wuala announced that it would allow no further renewals or purchase of storage; and that it would transition to read-only on the 30th of September and that all stored data would be deleted on the 15th of November 2015.

== See also ==
- Comparison of file synchronization software
- List of online backup services
- Comparison of online backup services
