= SugarSync =

Online backup service

- Developer: J2 Global
- Release: November 2009
- Operating system: Microsoft Windows; Mac iOS; Android
- Available in: English
- Type: Online backup service
- License: Proprietary software
- Website: sugarsync.com

SugarSync is a cloud service that enables active synchronization of files across computers and other devices for file backup, access, syncing, and sharing from a variety of operating systems, such as Android, iOS, Mac OS X, and Windows devices. For Linux, only a discontinued unofficial third-party client is available.

== Overview ==
The SugarSync program automatically refreshes its sync by constantly monitoring changes to files—additions, deletions, edits—and syncs these changes with the SugarSync servers. Any other linked devices then also sync with the SugarSync servers. Deleted files are archived in a "Deleted Files" folder. In the event the local sync folder is stored on a device which later becomes unavailable (secondary hard drive failure, etc.) the SugarSync program will interpret this event as if the user had purposely deleted the entire synchronization folder, resulting in deletion of all files from the user's storage account. Due to this limitation, it is best to only store the local synchronization folder on the boot drive. Files deleted by the user are not actually removed from SugarSync servers until the user does so manually; however, recovery of a larger nested folder structure may be difficult.

Originally offering a free 5 GB plan and several paid plans, the company transitioned to a paid-only model on February 8, 2014. Under the new model, the company offered temporary promotional pricing and encouraged subscribers to use subscription auto-renewal. However, the auto-renewal takes place at the non-promotional rate and no refunds are allowed through the new model. Moreover, if the account cannot be auto-renewed due to expiration of a credit card or some other change in payment terms, the account is automatically cancelled and the data deleted from the company's servers at the same time the account is cancelled. If emailed warnings are not received, SugarSync will delete a company's entire cloud-computing storage account. Furthermore, for the general user, no renewal reminders are sent, and once the account renews, no refunds are provided.

== Company history ==
SugarSync was born out of a company named Sharpcast, which was incorporated in 2004 by Gibu Thomas (CEO) and Ben Strong (Chief technical officer). In 2006, Sharpcast unveiled Sharpcast Photos, a tool for synchronizing images between multiple devices including PCs and mobile phones. Both founders left the company in November 2008. In December 2008, Laura Yecies was appointed as the CEO. Yecies and her team re-focused the company and renamed it SugarSync, Inc. in 2009. The company was headquartered in San Mateo, California.

In March 2013, Mike Grossman took over as CEO. In his self-introductory blog he promised to focus the business on mobile, sharing and collaboration, and enhancing the sync and mirrored capabilities of the product. The blog post was inundated with requests for a Linux client such that the top Google result for searches relating to SugarSync on Linux returned Mr Grossman's introductory message.

Sugarsync was acquired by J2 Global in March 2015.

== Product history ==
The company's first product was Sharpcast Photos, software designed to make it easier for people to view their photos on multiple devices and share them via the Internet.

Sharpcast Photos was shut down at the end of 2009. Users were given the option to migrate to the SugarSync service or retrieve their photos.

In June 2013 Samir Mehta posted, on the Introductory Blog post of SugarSync's new CEO, that SugarSync were "in the process of evaluating a SugarSync Linux app". As of January 2015, no further news has been posted about a Linux client for SugarSync.

In December 2013, SugarSync announced that they would be discontinuing their free 5 GB plan and transitioning to a paid-only service by February 2014.

== API and third-party addons ==
In March 2010, SugarSync unveiled an API. As a result, there are several unofficial SugarSync addons and applications available. These addons come both in the form of web services and browser extensions and desktop applications such as SugarSync Linux desktop client (now discontinued) by Mark Willis.

== See also ==
- Comparison of file synchronization software
- Comparison of online backup services
