= Tresorit =

Swiss cloud storage platform

- Founded: 2011; 15 years ago
- Founder: Istvan Lam; Szilveszter Szebeni; Gyorgy Szilagyi
- Headquarters: Zurich, Switzerland
- Services: Cloud storage
- Owner: Swiss Post
- Website: tresorit.com

Tresorit is a Swiss company providing end-to-end encrypted cloud storage and secure content collaboration services.

Founded in 2011, the company primarily serves businesses and organizations with elevated data protection and compliance requirements. Since 2021, Tresorit has been part of Swiss Post's digital business services, which, under the name 'Swiss Post Digital' offer secure communication platforms and connectable software solutions for SMEs, public authorities, and the healthcare sector, among others.

== History ==
Logo as of 2016

Tresorit was founded in 2011 by Hungarian software developers Istvan Lam, Szilveszter Szebeni and Gyorgy Szilagyi with the aim of providing a secure alternative to traditional cloud storage solutions. The company developed a cloud collaboration platform based on client-side end-to-end encryption and a zero-knowledge architecture.

In its early years, Tresorit gained attention through a public security challenge inviting researchers to attempt to compromise its encryption system. The initiative received coverage in technology and cybersecurity media.

The company initially positioned itself as a secure alternative to conventional cloud storage services and gradually expanded its offering toward enterprise-focused collaboration tools.

In 2021, Swiss Post Communications Services acquired a majority stake in Tresorit. The company is now part of Swiss Post, and continues to operate independently within Swiss Post’s digital division, while benefiting from the broader infrastructure and institutional framework of its parent organization.

Tresorit has offices in Zurich, Munich, and Budapest.

== Products and services ==
Tresorit provides a cloud-based platform for secure file storage and collaboration. Its services include encrypted file sharing, email encryption, electronic signatures, and encrypted data rooms for managing sensitive documents and workflows.

The platform is available on Windows, macOS, Linux, Android, and iOS.

== Technology ==
Tresorit uses client-side end-to-end encryption based on a zero-knowledge model. Files are encrypted on the user’s device before being uploaded to company servers.

According to the company, encryption keys remain under user control, meaning that Tresorit and third parties cannot access the content of stored files.

== Security challenge ==
Between 2013 and 2014, Tresorit organized a public challenge inviting security researchers to attempt to compromise the service's encryption implementation. The challenge received coverage in technology and cybersecurity media.

== Acquisition by Swiss Post ==
In 2021, Swiss Post Communications Services acquired a majority stake in Tresorit as part of Swiss Post’s broader digital services strategy.

== Reception ==
Tresorit has been covered by international technology and business publications in the context of secure cloud storage and encrypted collaboration services.

TechCrunch described the company as an early European provider of end-to-end encrypted cloud services, while The New York Times included it in discussions of secure file-sharing tools.

== See also ==
- Comparison of file hosting services
- Comparison of online backup services
- Remote backup service
