= Hotfile =

File hosting website

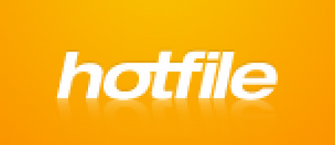
- Website type: File hosting service
- Available in: English and 19 languages
- Dissolved: 2013
- Owner: Hotfile Corp.
- Website: web.archive.org/web/20131204191916/http://hotfile.com/
- Commercial: Yes
- Registration: Optional
- Launched: March 18, 2001; 25 years ago
- Current status: Shut down by United States federal court

Hotfile was a one-click file hosting website founded by Hotfile Corp in 2006 in Panama City, Panama. On December 4, 2013, one day after a court judgement against them, Hotfile ceased all operations, the same day as signing a $4 million settlement with the Motion Picture Association of America (MPAA); the settlement had previously been misreported as $80 million.

== Usage ==
Hotfile allowed users to upload and download files with any web browser. Non-registered users were allowed to upload up to 400 MB at once. After a successful file upload, the user was given a unique URL which allowed others to download the file. Non-registered users had to wait 15 seconds in the download queue and might have needed to enter a CAPTCHA and have to wait 30 minutes to download another file after a previous download session ended (even if the file did not download completely). Hotfile did not provide a search engine or browser. The site was offered in 19 different languages including Arabic, Bulgarian, Czech, two types of Chinese, Dutch, German, English, French, Hungarian, Italian, Japanese, Polish, Portuguese, Romanian, Russian, Spanish, Serbo-Croatian and Turkish.

== Features ==
The service had a Link Checker where users could enter file URLs in order to check their current availability. There was also a Hotlink feature, which allowed users to directly link to their files for an additional fee.

== Terms of use and privacy policy ==
Hotfile was a service provider under the Digital Millennium Copyright Act, 17 U.S.C. § 512 ("DMCA"). Hotfile responded to claims of copyright infringement reported to its designated copyright agent.

In Hotfile's Privacy Policy under the 'Usage Data' section they stated "We automatically collect usage information...type of Web browser you use, your operating system, your Internet Service Provider, your IP address, the links you use, and the time and duration of your use of the Service...be aware, however, that we may be required to disclose information such as your IP address which could be used by others to attempt to identify you."

== Copyright-related lawsuits ==
In February 2011, Hotfile and its alleged owner Anton Titov (a foreign national residing in Florida) were sued by the MPAA on behalf of Disney Enterprises, 20th Century Fox, Universal Studios, Columbia Pictures, and Warner Bros. alleging both direct and secondary copyright infringement. Because the site charged membership fees for its premium service, the MPAA argued that Hotfile "profits richly while paying nothing to the studios" for the allegedly infringing files.

Google had argued in an amicus brief that Hotfile should benefit from the same protections that YouTube enjoys, arguing that "Hotfile did exactly what the DMCA demands, and plaintiffs’ takedown notices cannot be used to charge the service with knowledge of allegedly infringing material that those notices did not specifically identify."

The direct copyright infringement claims were thrown out by judge Adalberto Jordan in July 2011, leaving only the secondary liability allegations to be decided.

The secondary liability part of the lawsuit was likely to proceed in light of the inducement rule decided by the US Supreme Court in MGM Studios v. Grokster. In 2012, the movie studios have argued that Hotfile's business model was identical to that of Megaupload, which had just been shut down by the US government, and they asked for a summary judgement.

A summary judgement was granted by judge Kathleen Williams in August 2013, finding Hotfile vicariously liable for the actions of its users; she also found Titov personally liable. Judge Williams also denied the defendants an interlocutory appeal on the matter of vicarious liability (meaning they would have had to appeal the final verdict in the case). However Williams did not grant summary judgement on Hotfile's liability for inducement and contributory infringement. This later part of the trial was scheduled to begin as a jury trial on December 9, 2013, but a settlement was reached in early December, resulting in the site's closure.

=== Countersuit against Warner Brothers ===
On 12 September 2011 the company filed a counterclaim accusing movie studio Warner Bros. of fraud and abuse. According to the complaint, Warner systematically misused the copyright infringement takedown tool (SRA) Hotfile had built for them. Hotfile alleges that Warner has willingly taken down files without holding the copyrights, game demos and even open-source software and that the inappropriate takedowns continued even after the movie studio was repeatedly notified about the false claims.

The Electronic Frontier Foundation filed an amicus brief in this countersuit, arguing that the automated systems used by Warner are illegal.

Warner admitted to some errors in their takedown notices, however it refuted other claims, saying that they were legitimate; in the case of the open-source software they argued that it "had been posted alongside infringing Warner content in order to facilitate the rapid downloading of the infringing Warner content" and that it had permission of the relevant copyright owners to remove the gaming software in question. Furthermore, Warner rejected EFF's claims that the DMCA prohibits automated systems like the one it used. Warner claimed that less than one-tenth of one percent of the notices they sent to Hotfile (890 out of almost one million) were truly erroneous.

This countersuit survived the August 2013 summary judgement, but the December 2013 settlement with (see below) ended this countersuit as well.

=== Settlement and closure ===
On December 4, 2013, Hotfile ceased all operations, on the same day as signing a $4 million settlement with the Motion Picture Association of America (MPAA). The shutdown was preceded by the ruling of US Judge Kathleen M. Williams in August of the same year that the site and its owner, Anton Titov, had lost the safe harbor protection under DMCA "because they had actively encouraged infringement", and consequently could be held liable for the actions of their users. On December 3, the day prior, the court ruled a permanent injunction against Hotfile.

Before its closure, Hotfile accounted for approximately 2.9 billion downloads. Although it had received approximately 10 million DMCA takedown notices, Hotfile had only terminated 43 user accounts, according to the judge's August findings.
