= Comparison of file hosting services =

This is a comparison of notable file hosting services that are currently active. File hosting services are a particular kind of online file storage; however, various products that are designed for online file storage may not have features or characteristics that others designed for sharing files have.

This comparison does not include self-hosted file hosting platforms such as NextCloud and Seafile.

== File hosting services ==
No restriction
Limit is significantly above the average, mostly ignorable
Limit on some types of accounts, conditionally impacts the user experience
Limit across all accounts, significantly impacts the user experience
Total restriction across all accounts

| Web host | Storage size | | Max. file size | | Traffic or bandwidth limit | | Client-side encryption | Remote uploading? | Developer API? | FTP upload possible? | File versioning | Follows symlinks | Free GB (number only) | Append-only support? | Lifecycle Policy support? | Misc. notes |
| Web host | Free | Paid | Free | Paid | Free | Paid | Client-side encryption | Remote uploading? | Developer API? | FTP upload possible? | File versioning | Follows symlinks | Free GB (number only) | Append-only support? | Lifecycle Policy support? | Misc. notes |
|---|---|---|---|---|---|---|---|---|---|---|---|---|---|---|---|---|
| Amazon S3 | 5 GB 12-month free trial with credit-card (paid bandwidth) | Unlimited | 5 TB | | Amazon S3 limits | | Yes | No | REST, SOAP | ? | Yes | ? | 0 | No | Yes | —N/a |
| Apple iCloud | 5 GB | 50 GB to 12 TB paid | 50 GB | | 200/400/600 GB per month | | ? | No | Yes | No | Partly | No | 5 | | | 25 GB for previous MobileMe account subscriptions |
| Backblaze B2 | 10 GB | Unlimited | ? | | ? | | ? | ? | Yes | ? | Yes | ? | 10 | fileWrite allows existing files to become "hidden", which may get deleted with lifecycle rule daysFromHidingToDeleting | Yes | |
| Baidu Cloud | 6 GB | 2 TB | 4 GB | 20 GB | Traffic limit is not stable, after going over the traffic limit, there is a bandwidth limited to 500 KB/s then 10 KB/s after another traffic limit. | | ? | Yes | Yes | No | No | No | 6 | | Yes | Currently in China only |
| Box | 10 GB | 100 GB paid (Starter), Unlimited Business, Unlimited Enterprise | 250 MB Personal | 5 GB paid Personal, 5 GB Business, 5 GB Enterprise | 10 GB/month | 2 TB/month paid | ? | 30 MB per file via IFTTT | Yes | Business and Enterprise customers only | Some (premium) | No | 10 | | | Does not sync Mac files such as iWork (Keynote etc.). Does not support Linux OS. 50 GB free with Sony Xperia or HP Spectre 13 |
| Cloudflare R2 | 10 GB | Unlimited | 4.995 TiB | | Unlimited if egressing directly from R2 | | No | Yes | Yes | No | No | Yes | 10 | No | Yes | Limits can be adjusted for Enterprise customers |
| CloudMe | 3 GB, +500 MB for referrals up to 16 GB, | 500 GB | 150 MB | Unlimited | None | | ? | No | REST, SOAP, WebDAV | No | Rarely (60 days) | ? | 3 | | | Primarily focused on media files, synchronization and backup with web sharing. |
| Dropbox | 2 GB free, +500 MB for referrals up to 18 GB | 1 TB, 2 TB, or unlimited | 10 GB; Unlimited using client application | | 20 GB/day | 200 GB/day | No | No | Yes | No | 30 days by default, 1 year w/ add-on | Yes | 2 | | | Synchronization, backup and websharing. Does support Linux OS; 25 GB free with HTC Sense 4 & 5, 100 GB free with Samsung device |
| Fast.io | 50 GB | Unlimited (Credit-based) | 1 GB (Free) / 25 GB (Pro) / 50 GB (Bus) | | Unlimited (Credit-based) | Unlimited (Credit-based) | No | Yes | Yes | No | Yes | ? | 50 | | | Workspace-centric storage with HLS video streaming, real-time presence, and AI-powered semantic search. Supports AI agent accounts directly. |
| FileJoker | 10 GB | Unlimited | 2 GB | 10 GB | Speed limited to ~50 KB/s | 20 GB/day (Premium), 50 GB/day (VIP) | No | Premium accounts only | Yes | Premium / Affiliate only | No | ? | 10 | | | Free downloads have countdown waiting time, captcha, and bandwidth limits. Resuming interrupted downloads supported on premium accounts. Inactive files deleted after 30 days (free) or 90 days (premium). |
| filen.io | | | | | | | | | | 10 | | | | | | |
| Google Drive | 15 GB free | Paid plans with varied storage per user or per Workspace account (pooled storage) | 5 TB | | 750GB/day upload; 5TB/day download | | No | No | OAuth2 | No | Yes | No | 15 | | | Additional space for limited time period with some devices and services. |
| HCL Connections Files Cloud | (60-day free trial) | 1 TB | 2 GB | | None | | ? | No | CMIS, REST, Atom (standard) and OAuth2 | No | Yes | ? | 5 | | | Subscription costs US$6/year |
| Jumpshare | 2 GB | 1 TB | 250 MB | Unlimited | 5 GB/month | 200 GB/month | No | Yes | ? | ? | ? | ? | 2 | | | Real-time file sharing with built-in utilities for screenshots, screencasts, notes, and voice clips. |
| Keep2Share | 10 GB | Unlimited | 1 GB | 5 GB (Premium), 10 GB (Premium Pro) | Speed limited to ~50 KB/s | 20 GB/day (Premium), 50 GB/day (Premium Pro) | No | Premium accounts only | Yes | Premium / Affiliate only | No | ? | 10 | | | Free downloads have waiting time, captcha, and restricted download speed. Inactive files deleted after 30 days (free) or 90 days (premium). |
| koofr.eu | | | | | | | | | | 10 | | | | | | |
| MediaFire | 10 GB | 1 TB Pro accounts; 100 TB Business accounts | 20 GB | | 10 TB pro plan, Business plans receive an amount of bandwidth per month equal to ten times the account’s storage space. | | Yes | Yes | Yes | No | Yes | ? | 10 | | | Resuming of interrupted downloads possible. |
| Mega | 20 GB, additional 5 GB per achievements | Up to 16 TB paid | Available cloud drive space | | 10 GB | Up to 96 TB per month | Yes | No | Yes | No | Yes | ? | 20 | | | Apps for Windows, macOS, Linux, iOS, Android, Windows Phone, Blackberry, Chrome, Firefox, Safari; Supports HTML5 browsers. |
| Microsoft OneDrive | 5 GB (since 31 January 2016) (Note: Previously 15 GB and 25 GB since 2008.) +500 MB for referrals up to 5 GB | 200 GB paid 1 TB with paid Office (Paid) 365 account by default, can register 5 accounts for up to 5TB combined. | 100 GB | | Unlimited | | ? | No | Yes | No | Yes (Office files only) | No | 5 | | | 25 GB free for grandfathered accounts before April 2012 |
| Nutstore | 1 GB | Unlimited | 5 GB | | 1 GB Upload; 3 GB Download | Unlimited | No | No | Yes | No | Yes | No | 1 | ? | ? | Mostly operating in China |
| Oracle Cloud Infrastructure Object Storage | 10 GB | Unlimited | 10 TiB | | ? | | ? | ? | Yes | ? | Yes | ? | 10 | ? | Yes | |
| Proton Drive | 5 GB (subject to annual bonus) | 3 TB via Proton Family | ? | | ? | | End-to-end encryption | No | No | No | Yes | No | 5 | | | |
| SecureSafe | 100 MB | 100 GB | ? 2GB limit for SecureSend | | None | | Yes | No | No | No | No | ? | 0.1 | | | Offers Data Inheritance |
| SugarSync | 5 GB | 60 GB personal paid, Unlimited GB professional paid | 16 GB | | 10 GB/file/day | 250 GB file/day | No | No | REST | ? | Yes | ? | 0 | | | If you hit the limit your links will be disabled for 24 hours. The bandwidth limits only apply to public links. |
| Synology C2 | (30-day free trial) | Up to 200 TB without customized solution | Equal or less than the storage size | | 15 GB | Free download when not exceeding the storage size, additional fees will apply for downloads above the limit | ? | No | REST | No | Yes | ? | 15 | | Yes | Free upload but with limited data center selection. |
| Tarsnap | 0 | Unlimited; $0.25/GiB | 16 EiB - 1 | | 0 | Unlimited | Yes | No | libtarsnap.a | No | Client must manage archives | Optional with -H | 0 | Partial archives | No | Emphasis on carefully-constructed security model. File are encrypted client-side. |
| Tencent Weiyun | 10 GB | 2 TB | 1 GB regular upload, 32 GB Power Upload plug-in | | Unlimited | | No | No | No | No | No | ? | 10 | | | In English and Chinese (free version in Chinese only) |
| TitanFile | 0 | Unlimited | 100 MB | 10 GB paid, 50 GB professional | Unlimited | | Yes for paid plans | No | Yes | Yes; For enterprise clients only | Yes | ? | 0 | | Yes | HIPAA-compliant, group messaging, audit logs, granular security control, embedable on website. |
| Tresorit | 3 GB (free trial) | 100-1000 GB paid plans | 500 MB | 5 GB premium, 10 GB rest of paid plans | None | | Yes | No | No | No | For paid plans only | No | 3 | | | Files are client-side encrypted; zero-knowledge principles are used to prevent Tresorit itself from reading the files. |
| Wasabi | 0 | Unlimited | 5 TB | | Should be equal to the storage amount | | Yes | ? | Yes | Yes | Yes | ? | 0 | Yes | Yes | |
| Yandex Disk | Up to 20 GB free (10 GB when registering) | Up to 1024 GB paid | 2 GB upload via Web or WebDAV, 50 GB upload via application | | 200% of storage size per day | | No | No | Yes: REST, WebDAV, SDK | No | 14 days with free accounts 90 days with paid ones | ? | 10 | | | English, Russian, Ukrainian and Turkish interfaces. Service is tightly integrated with other Yandex services. Native apps for Windows, macOS, Linux, iOS, Android. Client-side encryption is available with 3rd party open source clients. |

== Former services ==
- Amazon Drive
- Copy.com
- Bitcasa
- Drop.io
- Fileserve
- Hotfile
- Humyo
- iDisk
- IFile.it
- Megaupload
- Pogoplug
- RapidShare
- SteekR
- Ubuntu One
- Wuala
- MobileMe
- Xdrive
- Yahoo! Briefcase
- ZumoDrive

== See also ==
- Cloud storage
- Comparison of file synchronization software
- Comparison of online backup services
- Comparison of online music lockers
- List of backup software
- Remote backup service
- Shared resource
