= ZumoDrive =

Defunct cloud-based file housing service

- Developers: Zecter, Inc.
- Release: February 2009
- Preview release: 0.989 / June 21, 2010; 16 years ago
- Operating system: Windows, macOS, Linux, iOS, Android, webOS
- Available in: English, Spanish, French, Italian, Portuguese, Japanese, Korean, Chinese
- Type: File hosting service
- Website: zumodrive.com (Offline)

ZumoDrive is a defunct cloud-based file hosting service operated by Zecter, Inc. On December 22, 2010, Zecter announced its acquisition by Motorola Mobility. The service enabled users to store and sync files online, and also between computers using their HybridCloud storage solution; the latter functionality stopped working in approximately September 2011, while the former was undergoing formal takedown on May 1, 2012. ZumoDrive had a cross-platform client (Windows, macOS, Linux, iOS, Android, and Palm webOS) that enabled users to copy any file or folder into the ZumoDrive virtual disk that was then synced to the web and the users' other computers and hand-held devices. Files in the ZumoDrive virtual disk could be shared with other ZumoDrive users or accessed from the web. Users could also upload files manually through a web browser interface. A free ZumoDrive account offered 2 GB of storage, and users could upgrade to paid plans ranging from 10 GB to 500 GB for a monthly subscription fee. The ZumoDrive service was integrated into Yahoo! Mail, allowing users to send or receive any file on their ZumoDrive (the integration with Yahoo! Mail has been stopped as of June 1, 2012), and powers HP's recent CloudDrive technology, bundled on all new HP Mini netbooks.

== History ==
ZumoDrive was created by the Silicon Valley–based company Zecter, which was founded by David Zhao, Kevin West, and Vijay Mani in 2007. Zhao is a former application developer for Amazon while West and Mani were former Microsoft employees.

The company received seed funding from Y Combinator, Tandem Entrepreneurs, and other seed and early-stage investors. An additional round of $1.5 million in funding has been secured as of late October 2009, led by Sherpalo Ventures, with Tandem Entrepreneurs and VeriFone CEO Douglas Bergeron participating. Development for ZumoDrive began in 2008 and the product launched in January 2009.

On December 22, 2010, Zecter announced its acquisition by Motorola Mobility.

Zumodrive announced that its service would no longer be available as of June 1, 2012, although users of the HP, CruzSync, and Toshiba branded services were initially unaffected.

== Functionality ==
While ZumoDrive functioned as a file synchronization and storage service, it employed an approach that allows content in the cloud to appear local to the filesystem. ZumoDrive synchronization uses SSL transfers with AES-256 encryption, and it supports revision history—by use of deltas or delta encoding technology—so files deleted from the ZumoDrive virtual disk may be recovered from any of the synced computers. ZumoDrive's version control also helped users know the history of a file they may have been currently working on, enabling more than one person to edit and re-post files without edit conflicts or loss of information. There is no limit to file size for files added via the ZumoDrive client. ZumoDrive used Amazon's S3 simple storage service to store files in the cloud.

The ZumoDrive service was a unique file sync and storage service in that content appears local to the filesystem and can be streamed from the cloud on demand. Users can stream music directly from ZumoDrive to iPhone, iPod Touch, Android and WebOS devices. The ZumoDrive service also offers intelligent "predictive caching" which allows copies of frequently used files to be stored locally so users can access these files when they don't have internet access. ZumoDrive allows users to selectively synchronize individual files, folders, or the entire virtual drive. Users can also link folders in place on their computers to their ZumoDrive, and these folders and all content will stay in sync across all devices. The ZumoDrive service allows storage-restricted devices (e.g., netbooks, iPhones, WebOS, and Android handsets), to have full access to the cloud, thereby making these devices appear to be as large as there is data available in the cloud.

== Criticism ==
Slow broadband connection speeds can make streaming large files, such as movies to mobile and other remote devices difficult.

While ZumoDrive encrypts transport of all content with 256-bit SSL, and stores that content encrypted on Amazon S3 servers, that content is still accessible to ZumoDrive administrators.

== See also ==
- List of online backup services
- Comparison of online backup services
- File synchronization
- File hosting service
- Cloud computing
