= Comparison of online backup services =

This is a comparison of online backup services.

Online backup is a special kind of online storage service; however, various products that are designed for file storage may not have features or characteristics that others designed for backup have. Online backup usually requires a backup client program. A browser-only online storage service is usually not considered a valid online backup service.

Online folder sync services can be used for backup purposes. However, some online folder sync services may not provide a safe online backup. If a file is accidentally locally corrupted or deleted, it depends on the versioning features of a folder sync service, whether this file will still be retrievable.

== Comparison ==
Provider	Windows^{1}	Linux^{1}	Mac^{1}	Android^{1}	iOS^{1}	Encrypted storage	Zero knowledge^{2}	Secure Key Management^{3}	Limited MB plan^{4}	Unlimited MB plan^{4}	$/MB plan^{4}	Unlimited BW ^{16}	Unlimited Transfers	Cloud hosted Net Drive^{5}	Sync^{7}	Autodetect changes^{12}	Public file hosting^{8}	Physical media restore^{9}	Server location(s)^{10}	Free online storage (non-trial)^{13}	Maximum per-file size	External hard drive support^{14}	Hybrid Option^{15}	Green Hosting	OpenSaaS
Backblaze	Yes	B2 only	Yes	Yes	Yes	Yes	No; Company must be given passphrase (to private key) to restore any data.	No	No	Yes	No	No	?			Yes	Yes	Yes	US, Europe	10 GB	No limit	Yes	No		
Baidu Cloud	Yes	Yes	Yes	Yes	Yes	Yes	No	?	No	No	Yes		?		Yes	Yes	Yes		China	2000 GB	4 GB (Non-member) 10 GB (Member) 20 GB (Super Member).		?		
Barracuda Backup Service	Yes	Yes	Yes			Yes	No	?	No fee per computer	No	Yes		?	Yes	Yes		No	Yes	US, Canada, Asia-Pacific, Europe	No			?		
Box	Yes	No	Yes	Yes	Yes	Yes	No	?	Yes	No			?	Yes	Yes	Yes			US	10 GB	250 MB (Free) 5 GB (Paid)				
Carbonite	Yes	No	Yes	Yes	Yes	Yes	Partial, optional for Windows only	?	Yes (Business only)	Yes (Home only)	No	Yes	?		Yes	Yes	Yes		US	No	4 GB	Yes	Yes		
CloudMe	Yes	Yes	Yes	Yes	Yes	No, but 3rd party apps available		?		No		Yes	?	Yes	Yes	Yes			Sweden	3 GB	150 MB (Free Accounts) No limit (Premium Accounts)	No Limit	No		
Comodo Backup	Yes	No	No			Yes	No	?	Yes	No	Yes (5)		?	No	No		No		US	No					
CrashPlan	Yes	Yes	Yes	Yes	Yes	Yes	Yes, except for web restore	Yes	Yes, 10TB	No	No	Yes	?	No	No	Yes	No	No	US, Australia	No	No Limit	Yes	No		
Dropbox	Yes	Does not work on filesystems other than ext4 and btrfs	Yes	Yes	Yes	Yes	No	?			Yes		?	No	Yes	Yes	Yes			2 GB	No Limit	Yes			No
Dropmysite	Yes	Yes	Yes			Yes	No	?	Yes	No	No	Yes	?		Yes	Yes	Yes		Global	2 GB	No limit		?		
Egnyte	Yes	Yes	Yes			Optional	Optional	?					?	Yes	Yes	Yes	Yes		US	No	No limit		?		
ElephantDrive	Yes	Yes	Yes	Yes		Yes	Optional (off by default)	?	Yes	No			?	Yes	Yes	Yes	Yes		US	No		Yes	?	No, Amazon AWS	
Google Drive	Yes	No, no provider-sanctioned Linux support.	Yes	Yes	Yes	Yes	No	?		No, Limited to 5 TB per user. See comments for details.	Yes	Yes	Yes	No	Yes	Yes	Yes		US, Worldwide	15 GB	5 TB			Yes: 78% (supplied) 100% (matched)	No
iCloud	Yes	No	Yes	No	Yes	Yes	Optional (off by default)	?	No	No	Yes		?	?	Yes	?	?		China for mainland China accounts; unknown for others	1 GB (everyone); 5 GB (Apple users only)		No		Yes, 94%	No
iDrive	Yes	Yes, but one has to manually run perl scripts.	Yes	Yes	Yes	Yes	Optional (excludes web interface)		No	No	Yes		?		Yes	Yes	Yes	Yes	unknown	10 GB	US	Yes			
Jumpshare	Yes	No	Yes	No	Yes	Yes			Yes	No	No	Yes	?		Yes	Yes	Yes	No	US, Europe	2 GB	250 MB on free, Unlimited on Jumpshare Plus			Yes: 75% (supplied) 100% (matched)	
Jungle Disk	Yes	Yes	Yes	Yes	Yes	Yes	Yes	Yes			Yes	Yes	?	Yes	Yes	Yes	Yes		US, Europe	No	No limit in Backup Vault	Yes		Partial, Amazon AWS or Rackspace Cloud Files.	
KeepVault	Yes	No	No			Yes		?	Yes	No	Yes		?			Yes			US		20 GB				
Livedrive	Yes	No	Yes	Yes	Yes	No	No	?	Yes	Online Backup only	No	Yes	?	Yes (paid-only)	Yes	Yes	Yes	Yes	UK	No	No limit	Yes			
MediaFire	Yes	Upload only	Yes	Yes	Yes	No	No	?	Yes	No	Yes	Yes	?	No	Yes	Yes	Yes		US	10 GB	No Limit	No	No		
MEGA	Yes	Yes	Yes	Yes	Yes	Yes	Yes	Yes	Yes	No	Yes	Yes	No	No	Yes	Yes, using MEGA Desktop App	Yes	No	Europe, New Zealand	20 GB	No limit	No	No		
MiMedia	Yes	No	No			Yes	No	?	Yes	No	Yes	Yes		No	No	Yes	No	No	US	7 GB	3 GB	Yes			
OneDrive	Yes	No, see note	Yes	Yes	Yes	Yes	No	?	Yes	No			Yes	No	Yes					5 GB for new users, 25 GB for older users	100 GB			Yes: 75% sourced 100% matched	No
Proton Drive	Yes	No	Yes	Yes	Yes	Yes	Yes	Yes	Yes	No										5 GB					
SpiderOak	Yes	Yes	Yes	Download Only	Download Only	Yes	Yes	?	Yes	Business only (min 10 users)	Yes	Yes	?	No	Yes	Yes	Yes			(2 GB free for 60 days only)	No limit	Yes	Yes		No
SugarSync	Yes	No	Yes	Yes	Yes	Yes	No	?	Yes	No	No		?		Yes	Yes	Yes (SugarSync account needed for folders)			No	100 MB (web) No limit (client app)				
Syncplicity	Yes	No	Yes	Yes	Yes	Yes	No	?			Yes				Yes	Yes	Yes		US	10 GB					
Tarsnap	Yes: via WSL2 or Cygwin	Yes	Yes	No	No	Yes	Yes	?	No	No	Yes		?	No						No				No, Amazon AWS	No
Tresorit	Yes	Yes	Yes	Yes	Yes	Yes	Yes	Yes	Yes	No	Yes	Yes	Yes	Yes	Yes	Yes	Yes	No	upon choice	3 GB	0.5 GB (free), 10 GB (paid)	Yes	No		
Unitrends Vault2Cloud	Yes	Yes	Yes			Yes	No	?	No	Yes	Yes		?	Yes	Yes		No	Yes	US	No					
Yandex.Disk	Yes	Yes	Yes	Yes	Yes	No	No	?	Yes				?	Yes	Yes	Yes	Yes		Russia	10 GB	50 GB				
Zmanda Cloud Backup	Yes	No	No			Optional	Optional	?			Yes		?	Yes				Yes	US, Europe, Singapore, Japan	No	No limit	Yes	Yes	Partial, Amazon AWS or Google Cloud Storage	

=== Legend ===
- ^1Windows/Linux/Mac/iOS/Android/BlackBerry: Supported operating systems for thick client (native binary application), which provide background data transmission and setting services.
- ^2Zero knowledge: The service provider has no knowledge of the user's encryption key, ensuring privacy of the backup data.
- ^3Secure Key Management: If yes, the user holds and controls the encryption key. If no, the service provider holds and controls the encryption key.
- ^4 Payment options/plans:
  - Limited MB plan: Pay per computer. Additional fee for storage over a threshold.
  - Unlimited MB plan: Pay per computer. Storage per computer is unlimited.
  - $/MB plan: Pay per unit of storage, but unlimited computers may share that storage.
- ^5Cloud hosted Net Drive: Cloud can serve storage over WebDAV, SMB/CIFS, NFS, AFP or other NAS protocol, allowing files to be streamed from the cloud. A change made to the cloud is immediately accessible to applications on all clients without needing to pre-download (sync) the file in full.
- ^7Sync: Synchronization between computers, and/or mobile devices (PDA, MDA,...)
- ^8Public Internet file hosting
- ^9Restore via physical media
- ^10Server location: Countries where physical servers are located. Where the data will be located.
- ^11 Still in Beta version
- ^12 Whether the desktop client (if available) can detect and upload changes without scanning all files.
- ^13 Many backup services offer a limited free plan, often for personal use. Often it is possible to increase the free backup limit through coupons, referrals, or other means that are not included in this column. This column also does not include free trials that are only available for a limited period of time.
- ^14 External hard drive support: Can refer to an alternate backup destination or whether the service can back up external drives.
- ^15 Hybrid Online Backup works by storing data to local disk so that the backup can be captured at high speed, and then either the backup software or a D2D2C (Disk to Disk to Cloud) appliance encrypts and transmits data to a service provider. Recent backups are retained locally, to speed data recovery operations.
- ^16 Unlimited BW: If bandwidth capping or limits are used on accounts.

=== Other features and limitations ===
Other notable limitations or features.

Baidu Cloud
Must be registered by verified phone first.
Box
Performance degrades after 10,000 files in sync folder. Technical limit of 40,000 files in sync folder. Does not sync .tmp files, Outlook PST files, hidden files (hidden folders are synced), or any file or folder with \/*?":<>| in the name.
Dropbox
Performance degrades with more than 300,000 files in sync folder. This is a soft limit.
Google Drive
All account types are limited to 750 GB upload bandwidth per day. Enterprise accounts are now limited to 5 TB per paid user on the account whereas prior to May 2023 only a single user was required for the advertised unlimited storage. Once 5 users are on an Enterprise account, more storage can be requested in 25 TB allotments once every 90 days, but extra storage is not guaranteed. The extra allotted storage is also removed when users on the account drop under 5. Thus unlimited storage is unfeasible to attain with Google Drive's new restrictions.
Sugarsync
Limited to 80,000 files per top level sync folder. To work around, one can create multiple syncing folders, but each top level folder is limited to 80k files. Also, Microsoft outlook and Apple iTunes databases are unsupported.

== Defunct services ==
- Bitcasa closed its services in February 2017.
- Copy was discontinued on May 1, 2016.
- Dell DataSafe was discontinued on June 11, 2015.
- drop.io
- Mozy, shutdown in 2019, and it redirects users to Carbonite.
- Norton Zone was discontinued on July 7, 2014.
- Streamload aka MediaMax
- Ubuntu One was discontinued on June 1, 2014.
- Windows Live Mesh
- Wuala was discontinued on November 15, 2015.
- Xdrive
- ZumoDrive

== See also ==
- File hosting service
- Remote backup service
- Comparison of online music lockers
- Comparison of file synchronization software
- Comparison of file hosting services
- Cloud storage
- Shared resource
- File sharing
- List of backup software
