= Comparison of backup software =

Feature comparison of backup software. For a more general comparison see List of backup software.

== List ==
Package	Network optimized (rsync)	Versioning (diff, chunk, hardlink)	Full client side Encryption	Error Detection	Simple server	Distributed partials	Renames optimized	Web interface	Webmin module
AMANDA			?					?	Optional (separate download + cost)
Areca Backup			?					?	No
Attic	Yes	Yes; Buzhash chunking	Yes; AES, SHA256 HMAC with PBKDF2 encrypted keyfiles	Yes; by MAC of plaintext and ciphertext	No	No	Yes; through deduplication	No	No
BackupPC	Yes	Yes; hard-links	No; but can be achieved via pluggable transfer mechanism	No			Yes; through deduplication	Yes	No
Bacula	Yes	Yes; Incremental	Yes	Yes; Silent error detection (MD5 or SHA1). Backup certification Verify Job	Yes; *For Linux		Yes; Deduplication optimized storage driver	Yes	Yes
Back In Time	Yes	Yes; hard-links	Yes; EncFS					No	No
BitTorrent	Yes	No	No	Yes	No	Yes	No	Yes	?
Borg (fork of Attic)	Yes	Yes; Buzhash chunking	Yes; AES, SHA256 HMAC with PBKDF2 encrypted keyfiles	Yes; by MAC of plaintext and ciphertext	No	No	Yes; through deduplication	(in development)	No
Box Backup			?					No	No
Bup	Yes	Yes, chunk deduplication	No	Yes (Par2)	Yes	?	Yes, through deduplication	Yes	No
cpio	No	No	No	Yes	No	No	No	?	Optional (separate download)
Cobian Backup (v11)			?					No	?
Cwrsync - Rsync for Windows	Yes	No	No	No	No	No	No	No	No
DirSync Pro			No					No	No
DAR	Yes	Yes; Incremental; chunking;	Yes	Yes	?	?		?	?
dcfldd	No	No	No	No	No	No	No	No	No
dd	No	No	No	No	No	No	No	No	No
dump	No	No	No	No	No	No	No	No	No
duplicity	Yes	Yes; Incremental	Yes	No	Yes	No		No	No
Duplicati	Yes	Yes; Incremental	Yes	No	Yes	No		Yes	No
FlyBack			No					?	No
git	Yes	Yes; snapshot	Yes (via git-remote-gcrypt)	Yes	No	No	Yes	?	?
git-annex	Yes	No	Partial (with remote block device)	Yes	No	Yes	Yes	No	No
Kopia		Yes	Yes	Yes			Yes; through deduplication	?	?
luckyBackup			No					No	No
Mondo Rescue	Yes	Yes; Incremental	No	Yes				?	No
Redo Backup and Recovery			No					No	No
rdiff-backup	Yes	Yes; reverse incremental	No	No	No	No		Yes; via Third-party	Yes
rsync	Yes	Yes; hard-links (--link-dest)	No	No	No	No	No	?	Optional (separate downloads)
star/gtar	No	Yes	No	No	No	No	No	?	?
zsync	Yes	No	No	Yes	Yes	No	Yes	No	No
zpaq	Yes	Yes; Incremental	Yes; AES-256/CTR	Yes; SHA-1	No	No	Yes; through deduplication	No	No
