= List of backup software =

This is a list of notable backup software that performs data backups. Archivers, transfer protocols, and version control systems are often used for backups but only software focused on backup is listed here. See Comparison of backup software for features.

== Free and open-source software ==
Name	License	Written with	Runs on Windows	Runs on macOS	Runs on Linux	Has a GUI?	Has a CLI?	Last updated
Amanda	BSD	C, Perl	Yes	Yes	Yes	Only with Amanda Enterprise	Yes	August 25, 2023
Attic	BSD	Python	No	Yes	Yes	No	Yes	May 16, 2015
BackupPC	GPLv2.0	Perl	Yes (with Cygwin)	Yes	Yes	Yes	?	June 20, 2020 (Stable)
Back In Time	GPL-2.0-or-later	Python	No	No	Yes	Yes	Yes	June 5, 2025
Bacula	AGPLv3.0	C, C++	Yes	Yes	Yes	Yes	Yes	March 22, 2024
BorgBackup	BSD-3	Python, Cython, C	Yes (with Cygwin)	Yes	Yes	Optional (BorgBase, BorgWeb, Vorta)	Yes	July 19, 2026
Box Backup	BSD/GPLv2.0	C++	Yes	Yes	Yes	Yes	?	August 19, 2018
Bup	LGPLv2.0	Python, Bash, C	Yes (with Cygwin)	Yes	Yes	No	Yes	October 20, 2018
DAR	GPLv2	C++	Yes	Yes	Yes	Optional (DarGUI, Kdar, gdar)	Yes	August 2, 2025
DirSync Pro	GPLv3	Java	Yes	Yes	Yes	Yes	?	March 17, 2018
Duplicati	LGPL	C#	Yes	Yes	Yes	Yes	Yes	February 2, 2013 (v1.3.4, deprecated) May 25, 2023 (v2.0.7.1, beta)
duplicity	GPL	Python	Yes (with Cygwin)	Yes	Yes	Optional (Déjà Dup)	Yes	December 5, 2025
FlyBack	GPL	Python	No	No	Yes	Yes	?	May 5, 2010
FreeFileSync	GPLv3	C++	Yes	Yes	Yes	Yes	Yes	October 16, 2026
git-annex	GPL3+	Haskell	No	Yes	Yes	Partial	Yes	Feb 19, 2019
luckyBackup	GPLv3	C++	No	No	Yes	Yes	Yes	Nov 18, 2018
Proxmox Backup Server	AGPLv3.0	Rust	No	No	Yes	Yes	Yes	March 29, 2023
Restic	BSD 2-Clause License	Go	Yes	Yes	Yes	No	Yes	Nov 8, 2024
rdiff-backup	GPL	Python	Yes	Yes	Yes	Optional (JBackpack, Rdiffweb, Minarca)	Yes	Sep 8, 2023
rsnapshot	GPL	Perl	No	Yes	Yes	Webmin module	Yes	Jan 27, 2025

== Proprietary ==
Name	Publisher	Runs on Windows?	Runs on macOS?	Runs on Linux?	Has a GUI?	Continuous data protection (Note: This criterion includes near-continuous data protection as well)
@MAX SyncUp	@MAX software	Yes	No	No	Yes	Yes
Acronis True Image	Acronis	Yes	Yes	No	Yes	Yes
Argentum Backup	Argentum Software	Yes	No	No	Yes	No
BackupAssist	Cortex IT Labs	Yes	No	No	Yes	No
Backup Exec	Veritas Software	Yes	Yes	Yes	Yes	Yes
Bacula Enterprise	Bacula Systems SA	Yes	Yes	Yes	Yes	Yes
Bvckup 2	Pipemetrics SA	Yes	No	No	Yes	No
Catalogic DPX	Catalogic Software	Yes	No	Yes	Yes	Yes
MSP360 Backup	MSP360	Yes	Yes	Yes	Yes	No
Cobian Backup	Luis Cobian	Yes	No	No	Yes	No
Cohesity	Cohesity	Yes	Yes	Yes	Yes	Yes
Commvault	Commvault	Yes	Yes	Yes	Yes	Yes
Comodo Backup	Comodo Group	Yes	No	No	Yes	Yes
Crashplan	Code42	Yes	Yes	Yes	Yes	Yes
Dmailer Backup	Dmailer	Yes	Yes	No	Yes	No
EMC NetWorker	EMC Corporation	Yes	Yes	Yes	Yes	No
Genie Backup Manager	Genie-Soft	Yes	No	Yes	Yes	Yes
HP Data Protector	HP Software & Solutions	Yes	Yes	Yes	Yes	Yes
IBM Spectrum Protect (Tivoli Storage Manager)	IBM	Yes	Yes	Yes	Yes	Yes
Image for Windows	TeraByte Unlimited	Yes	No	Yes	Yes	No
Infinite Disk	Chili Pepper Software	Yes	No	No	Yes	Exclusively
InMage DR-Scout	InMage	Yes	No	Yes	Yes	Yes
KeepVault	KeepVault	Yes	Partial	No	Yes	Yes
Macrium Reflect	Paramount Software UK Ltd	Yes	No	No	Yes	Yes
NetVault Backup	QuestSoftware	Yes	Yes	Yes	Yes	Yes
Norton 360	Symantec	Yes	No	Yes	Yes	No
Norton Ghost	Symantec	Yes	No	Yes	Yes	No
Novabackup	NovaStor	Yes	No	Partial	Yes	No
NTBackup	Microsoft	Yes	No	No	Yes	No
Retrospect	Retrospect Inc	Yes	Yes	Yes	Yes	No
Rubrik	Rubrik Inc	Yes	Yes	Yes	Yes	Yes
SpiderOak	SpiderOak	Yes	Yes	Yes	Yes	Yes
Syncovery	Super Flexible Software	Yes	Yes	Yes	Yes	Yes
System Center Data Protection Manager	Microsoft	Yes	No	No	Yes	Yes
Time Machine	Apple Inc.	No	Yes	No	Yes	No
Tonido Backup	CodeLathe	Yes	Yes	Yes	Yes	No
Windows Backup and Restore	Microsoft	Yes	No	No	Yes	No

== Defunct software ==
Name	Type	Run on Windows?	Run on macOS?	Run on Linux?	Dates active
Mac Backup aka MobileMe	Apple Inc.	No	Yes	No	Until 2011
Areca Backup	GPLv2.0	Yes	No	Yes	?
Mozy	Commercial and closed-source	Yes	Yes	No	Until 2018
Yosemite Server Backup	Commercial and closed-source	Yes	No	Yes	Until September 30, 2017
SyncToy	Freeware and closed-source	Yes	No	No	Until January 2021
X-Copy	Commercial	No	No	No	Until 1993

== See also ==
- Comparison of file synchronization software
- Comparison of online backup services
- Data recovery
- File synchronization
- List of data recovery software
- Remote backup service
- Tape management system
