= Grsync =

Graphical interface for the rsync file synchronization utility

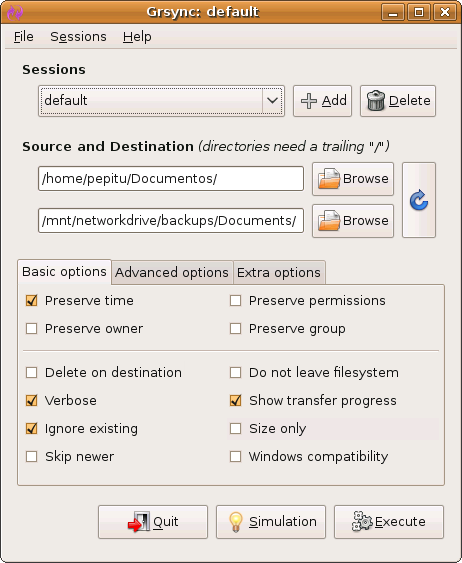
- Original author: Piero Orsoni
- Release: 17 December 2005; 20 years ago
- Stable release: 1.3.1 / 14 August 2023; 3 years ago
- Written in: C
- Operating system: Unix-like; Microsoft Windows
- Platform: GTK
- Type: Differential backup; File synchronization
- License: GNU General Public License
- Website: www.opbyte.it/grsync/
- Repository: sourceforge.net/p/grsync/code/HEAD/tree/

Grsync is a graphical user interface for rsync. rsync is a differential backup and file synchronization tool widely used in Unix-like operating systems.

Grsync is developed with the GTK widget toolkit. Like rsync, Grsync is free and open-source software licensed under the GNU General Public License.

== About ==
Rsync is a command-line tool for creating backups in Linux systems. It assists with moving files, backing up local folders, SSH tunneling, delta-only synchronization, and so on.

Grsync provides controls for commonly used rsync options and accepts additional command-line arguments. Configurations can be saved as named sessions, imported and exported, or grouped into session sets. A simulation mode previews a synchronization operation before it is carried out. The interface displays progress information, rsync output and errors, and can save output to a log file.

The program can execute custom commands before and after synchronization. It also includes a batch script, grsync-batch, for running saved sessions through scheduling tools such as cron. Although remote destinations are supported, the interface does not provide remote directory browsing.

== Development ==
Grsync was written by Piero Orsoni. Version 0.1.1 was released on 17 December 2005. Ports for Mac OS X and Windows were announced in 2009, and version 1.0.0, released in February 2010, incorporated the Maemo port. Version 1.3.0, released on 23 November 2020, added support for GTK 3.

In January 2013, Linux Journal gave Grsync its monthly Editors' Choice Award. Reviewer Shawn Powers praised its presentation of rsync options as checkboxes and text fields, and its ability to retain source and destination settings in saved sessions.

== See also ==
- Back in Time (Linux software)
- luckyBackup
