= Allway Sync =

Allway sync
- Developer(s): Botkind, Inc. (2004–23); Siber Systems (2023–present)
- Initial release: April 10, 2004; 21 years ago
- Stable release: 22.0.1 / December 31, 2022; 2 years ago
- Operating system: Windows 2000 and later
- Available in: 38 languages
- Type: Backup software
- License: Freemium
- Website: allwaysync.com

Allway Sync is backup and file synchronization software that allows backing up and synchronizing files to the same or different drives, to different media (CD, DVD, Flash, zip), or to a remote server.

In January 2023, Siber Systems, Inc. acquired the right to continue to develop software created by BotKind, Inc. Siber already offers other similar software (like GoodSync and Super Flexible).

== Features ==
- Like Super Flexible File Synchronizer, GoodSync and Unison File Synchronizer, it has the capability to remember the previous state of directories in a database, and thus also synchronize deletions.
- It can synchronize more than two directories at once.
- It can update and back-up files over a local network or the Internet, although the functionality of FTP support is debated
- Support for many file systems, like FAT, NTFS, SAMBA, NetWare, CDFS, and UDF.
- Includes a scheduler.
- File masks and filters.

== Versions ==
There are various versions. Users of the freeware version are requested to buy the pro version if they use the software for a commercial purpose or to synchronize more than 40,000 files in 30-day period. This pro version has exactly the same functionality as the free version.

- Allway sync (freeware version)
- Allway sync Pro (for use in businesses, governments military and other enterprise environments. Removes the 40,000 files/month limitation)
- Allway Sync 'n' Go (For USB and other removable drives)
- Allway Sync 'n' Go U3 (For U3-enabled flash devices)
- Allway Sync 'n' Go in Portable Application Format (for USB sticks)

== Future ==
As of January 1. 2023, Allway Sync has become a part of GoodSync. The development and support for Allway Sync will also be discontinued. (Information from support.) Allway Sync customers can migrate to GoodSync by creating an account on GoodSync's website, using the same eMail address that was used for Allway Sync registration. However, Allway Sync already installed as well as pro license will keep working.

== See also ==
- Backup
  - List of backup software
- Disk image
  - Comparison of disc image software
- File synchronization
  - Comparison of file synchronization software
