= Syncovery =

Syncovery (formerly Super Flexible File Synchronizer)
- Developers: Super Flexible Software GmbH & Co. KG.
- Stable release: Syncovery 10.12.6 / March 7, 2024; 19 months ago
- Operating system: Windows, macOS, Linux, FreeBSD
- Type: Backup software
- License: Commercial proprietary, shareware version available
- Website: www.syncovery.com

Syncovery (Super Flexible File Synchronizer until 2012) is backup and file synchronization software that allows backing up and synchronizing files to the same or different drives, to different media (CD, DVD, Flash, zip), or to a remote server.

== Features ==
- Like Allway Sync, GoodSync and Unison, it has the capability to remember the previous state of directories in a database, and thus also synchronize deletions. It can also detect moved files and move them on the other side.
- The program fully supports Unicode characters so that it can copy filenames in all languages.
- Includes a scheduler, which can run as a background app or as service. Service configuration is particularly seamless, and progress is reported to the GUI.
- Support for various Internet protocols, including FTP, FTPS, SFTP/SSH, WebDAV, SSL, and HTTP.
- Natively supports many cloud storages, including Amazon S3 web storage, Microsoft Azure BLOB Storage, Google Cloud Storage, Google Drive, DropBox, Box, SharePoint and OneDrive, Backblaze B2, Rackspace Cloud Files, and others.
- Compression Support using the Zip, 7-zip, and Syncovery's native Sz container formats.
- Encryption Support for AES-256 and PGP.
- Copy files locked by the operating system.
- Versioning, i.e. the ability to keep multiple older versions of each file in the backup.
- Block Level Copying
- File masks & filters.

== See also ==
- File synchronization
- Backup
- Disk image
- List of backup software
- List of disk imaging software
