= BUP =

BUP may refer to:

- .bup, a type of backup information file used in DVD video
- bup, backup software that uses Git packfiles for storage
- Baltic University Programme, a network of about 225 universities and other institutes of higher education in the Baltic Sea region
- Bangladesh University of Professionals, a public university of Bangladesh
- Banque de l'Union Parisienne, a French investment bank
- Basilan Unity Party, a political party in the Philippines
- Bethesda Urban Partnership in Bethesda, Maryland
- Bononia University Press, an Italian University Press and art book publisher
- British Unionist Party, a Scottish political party
- British United Press, a news agency in Canada
- Bucknell University Press, a publisher of books about the humanities and social and biological sciences
