= GoodSync =

Backup and file synchronization program

- Developer(s): Siber Systems Inc.
- Stable release: 11.11.4 (Windows); 11.11.4 (Mac OS X) / July 7, 2022; 2 years ago
- Written in: C++
- Operating system: Windows XP and later OS X Android iOS
- Size: Windows: 28.0 MB; OS X: 28.3 MB
- Available in: English, Spanish, French, German, Russian and others (35 total)
- Type: Backup software
- License: Shareware
- Website: goodsync.com

GoodSync is a backup and file synchronization program. It is used for synchronizing files between two directories, either on one computer, or between a computer and another storage device (e.g. another computer, a removable disc, a flash drive or a smartphone) or between a computer and a remote computer or server.

== Features ==
GoodSync allows the same version of files to be maintained on multiple computing devices. In other words, when two devices are synchronized, the user can be sure that the most current version of a file is available on both devices, regardless of where it was last modified.

- File masks and filters allow the user to define exactly what files and folders to include and ignore.
- It detects 'conflicts' where a file has been modified on both sources, and displays these to the user.
- A tree view of the intended synchronization, with many views such as files to overwrite, files to delete, files with same length, but different time and excluded files.
- Like SuperFlexible file synchronizer, Allway sync and Unison, it has the capability to remember the previous state of directories in a database, and thus also propagate deletions.
- Can automatically keep backups of old files that are deleted/overwritten
- GoodSync can detect when just the time or state of a file has been changed and modify it on the other side, without copying the entire file.
- GoodSync can update and back-up files over a local network or the Internet. For this, it supports FTP, SFTP, WebDAV, Amazon S3 web storage, Amazon Drive, OneDrive/OneDrive for Business, BackBlaze, Google Drive, Windows Azure, Windows Mobile/ActiveSync, Dropbox (via Core API) and GSTP (GoodSync Connect proprietary protocol). For synchronization with Android devices over GSTP, GoodSync Server can be run on device. Note that per late 2017 some protocols that were supported in version 9 (Google Drive, ACD, BackBlaze, DropBox, Box, OneDrive, SharePoint and Office365) were dubbed "out-of-beta", having never been stated to be beta before, and removed from GoodSync version 9, requiring a paid upgrade to version 10.
- Scheduler: synchronization jobs can be automatically run according to any desired schedule.
- On-file-change: synchronization can be triggered by changes in left or right folder.
- Recognizes a removable drive, even if mounted as a different letter than before.
- Can copy locked files.
- Unique to GoodSync enterprise edition:
  - Mass deployment (Installation, Activation and Configuration)
  - Policies: Customize User Experience
  - Running scripts before or after the synchronization process
  - Force backup or sync on Windows Logon and/or Logoff
  - Configure and execute jobs from Command Line
  - Command line version, including the ability to schedule a job from command line
  - Integration with Active Directory
  - Parameterized backup paths such as %YYYY%-%MM%-%DD%

== Versions ==
There are several versions:

- GoodSync (shareware version, 30-day fully functional, after this it can only sync with limitations, such as up to three jobs with up to 100 files per job and no unattended use)
- GoodSync Pro
- GoodSync 2Go (For USB and other removable drives)
- GoodSync Enterprise (and Enterprise Server)
- GoodSync for Mac
- GoodSync for Linux (shareware, command line version and GoodServer)
- GoodSync version 10 beta (for Windows, re-designed with modern UI and additional features)

== See also ==
- File synchronization
- Backup
- Disk image
- List of backup software
- List of disk imaging software
