= MSP360 =

Application service provider

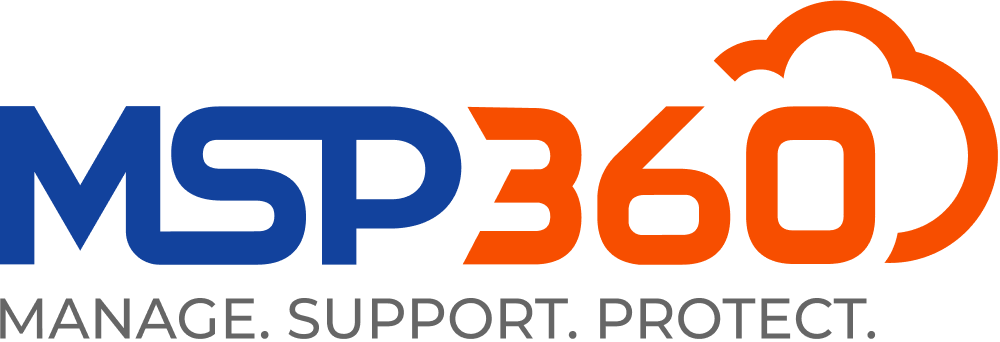
- Industry: Software
- Founded: 2008
- Headquarters: Bakery Square, Pittsburgh, Pennsylvania, United States
- Products: MSP360 Backup; MSP360 Remote Desktop; MSP360 RMM; CloudBerry Drive; CloudBerry Explorer
- Website: msp360.com

MSP360, formerly CloudBerry Lab, is a software and application service provider company that develops online backup, remote desktop and file management products integrated with more than 20 cloud storage providers.

MSP360 Backup and CloudBerry Explorer are offered for personal use in a “freemium” model. Other products, including more advanced MSP360 Backup versions, are sold per license with free trials available. MSP360 Backup web service is a Backup-as-a-Service application with centralized management and monitoring that allows for Managed Service Providers and businesses backup and restore of desktops and servers.

MSP360 Backup supports Windows, Windows Server, macOS, and Linux operating systems and can work with Microsoft SQL Server and Exchange applications, and VMware and Microsoft Hyper-V virtualization software. In addition, MSP360 provides a cloud to cloud backup solution for Microsoft 365 and Google Workspace, enabling secure data protection and recovery across both ecosystems.

== History ==
MSP360 was founded as CloudBerry Lab in 2008 and incorporated in 2011, initially releasing CloudBerry Explorer for Amazon S3, followed by versions for Microsoft Azure, Google Cloud, and OpenStack Swift. It was at first based in Newport Beach, California.

In 2011, the company released MSP360 Backup, followed by releases to support for Windows Server imaging, Microsoft SQL Server and Exchange applications, and Bare Metal Restore for Windows Server and desktop operating systems. MSP360 Backup added support for Linux and Mac operating systems in 2015, followed by editions for Synology and QNAP.

In 2012, the company introduced MSP360 Backup web console; a SaaS backup and disaster recovery web service for managed service providers and businesses that require centralized administration and management for larger environments.

In 2018, the company introduced the MSP360 Remote Desktop, a free remote control and desktop sharing product designed for secure access and control of remote desktops or servers over the internet.

In 2020, the company's corporate headquarters were moved to Pittsburgh.

In 2021, MSP360 introduced MSP360 RMM, an endpoint monitoring and management solution designed for MSPs and IT teams to manage their IT infrastructures.

== Products ==
MSP360 develops software and web services to help Managed Service Providers, businesses, and consumers manage backup and disaster recovery and perform cloud file management and synchronization. The company's main products include MSP360 Backup, MSP360 Remote Desktop, CloudBerry Explorer, and CloudBerry Drive.

=== MSP360 Backup ===
MSP360 Backup
- Developer: MSP360
- Release: April 2009; 17 years ago
- Operating system: Windows Server, Windows, macOS, Linux
- Type: Online backup
- License: Proprietary
- Website: www.msp360.com/managed-backup/

MSP360 Backup is an online backup app that integrates with 3rd-party cloud storage providers. It supports data backup and restore for Windows (desktop and servers), macOS and Linux. Additionally, it offers support for Microsoft SQL Server, Microsoft Exchange, VMware, Hyper-V, Office 365 and G Suite (Google Apps). It is available in several commercial editions as well as a free offering (MSP360 Backup Desktop Free). MSP360 Backup is also available as a SaaS web service designed to help service providers to manage backup and recovery across multiple computers or servers.

Both MSP360 Backup software and web console are designed to automate the backup and recovery of files, folders, and system images. It is storage-agnostic, meaning storage is decoupled from the backup license. Customers work directly with the cloud storage providers that have the pricing and features they need. MSP360 Backup supports over 20 cloud storage providers, including: Amazon S3, Amazon Glacier, Microsoft Azure, Google Cloud Platform, Backblaze B2, Wasabi, OpenStack, S3 Compatible, and others. MSP360 Backup supports multiple data storage tiers, including lower cost options like Microsoft Azure Cool Blob Storage and Archive Blob Storage, Amazon S3 Infrequent Access and Glacier, and Google Cloud Storage Nearline and Coldline.

==== History ====
The 2011, MSP360 Backup was released with support for Amazon S3. It was subsequently updated with support for Microsoft Azure, Google Cloud Platform and a number of other cloud vendors.

In late 2011, MSP360 released a Windows Server Edition, followed by support for Microsoft SQL Server, Microsoft Exchange, and Bare Metal Restore.

MSP360 Backup added additional operating system support for Linux and macOS in 2015. A freeware version of MSP360 Backup also appeared that year.

==== Technology ====
MSP360 Backup is written primarily in the C# and C++. programming languages. Windows versions also rely on .NET, while MSP360 Backup web console is built using C#, Asp.NET, Angular, and Node.js.

==== Features ====
MSP360 Backup provides backup and recovery functionality to / from the cloud, local storage, and network shares. Backup and recovery plans can be configured using a graphical user interface. A command-line interface is also available for all editions of MSP360 Backup on all supported operating systems (Windows, macOS, and Linux).

MSP360 has developed a proprietary block-level algorithm that speeds data uploads during backups to the cloud. In addition, the company uses a proprietary image-based algorithm to back up complete systems as image files, while retaining the ability to recover only specific files from within those images, if desired.

MSP360 Backup supports the recovery of images directly to cloud-based virtual server services such as Amazon EC2, Azure Virtual Machines, and Google Compute Engine, as well as to bare-metal devices. The product can restore system images to computers with no operating system installed by using bootable USB or ISO disk images.

MSP360 Backup software supports synthetic full backup functionality for Amazon S3 and Wasabi Hot Storage. When performing a typical incremental backup sequence, it is advised to perform full backups from time to time. Which is time and resource consuming. To reduce the bandwidth and amount of data uploaded, with synthetic full backup feature software scans the data, previously backed up to the storage and uploads only new and modified blocks instead of the full set of files. According to MSP360 tests, synthetic full backups are up to 80 percent faster than a typical full image-based backup.

MSP360 Backup can perform backups of Microsoft SQL Server and Microsoft Exchange databases and recover them to an active, running state. On Linux, MSP360 Backup allows users to back up files and folders to cloud storage. The product supports a variety of Linux distributions, including: Ubuntu, Debian, SUSE, Red Hat, Fedora, CentOS, Oracle Linux and Amazon Linux.

MSP360 Backup can be configured to perform a complete backup of a file directory or disk image. It also supports incremental backup functionality at the block level, meaning that users are able to back up only new or updated portions of files after an initial backup has been completed.

Backups can be executed manually or via custom schedules.

MSP360 Backup supports file compression and 256-bit AES encryption. Server-side encryption (encryption-at-rest) for cloud storage with support and filename encryption are also available.

==== Data Recovery and Restoration ====
MSP360 Backup provides flexible data recovery options. Backups can be restored to physical, virtual, or cloud virtual machines. The product can restore all files from a backup, or recover selected individual files. The product includes a recovery wizard that guides users through the data restoration process.

MSP360 features also include:

- Email notifications to alert users about the status of backup and recovery operations.
- Granular control of the backup process and file versioning.
- Flexible configuration of data retention policies.

==== Software Editions ====
MSP360 Backup software is available in several editions, each designed to address different use cases. Windows Desktop edition is intended for file and image-based backups, whereas the Windows Server, Microsoft Exchange, Microsoft SQL Server, and Ultimate editions are designed to meet the needs of businesses running Windows Server. There is no support for backup to FTP although is listed on their website. MacOS and Linux editions address backup needs on those platforms.

==== Web Service ====
For managed service providers (MSPs) and businesses that need a way to centrally manage backup with their customers and within their environments MSP360 also has a subscription SaaS offering. The hosted web console provides the means to manage and monitor large environments from a single dashboard with centralized management and monitoring, remote desktop access as well as storage, billing, and capacity reporting.

MSP360 Backup web console is integrated with Autotask, ConnectWise, Optitune, Microsoft 365, Google Workspace.,

==== Pricing ====
For MSP360 Backup, three license types exist:

- Per-computer licensing - Server, Desktop, MS SQL, MS Exchange and Ultimate licenses that are installed on a computer
- Per-host licensing - for the virtual machine edition
- Per-user licensing - for Google Workspace and Microsoft 365 backup

=== MSP360 RMM ===
MSP360 RMM
- Developer: MSP360
- Release: June 2021; 5 years ago
- Operating system: Windows Server, Windows
- Type: Remote monitoring and management
- Website: www.msp360.com/rmm/

On June 29, 2021, MSP360 announced the launch of MSP360 RMM, a cloud-based remote monitoring and management (RMM) solution. The product is integrated with MSP360 Backup and is designed to allow managed service providers (MSPs) to manage and monitor IT infrastructure through a centralized web-based console.

MSP360 RMM provides functionality for system and performance monitoring, Windows patch management, software deployment, alerting, reporting, PowerShell scripting, antivirus management, and remote access. The platform supports a multi-tenant management model and is intended for use in MSP and IT service environments. MSP360 RMM supports Windows workstations and Windows Server operating systems.

==== Features ====
MSP360 RMM includes system resource monitoring that allows administrators to view hardware and performance metrics through a centralized dashboard. The Windows Patch Management feature enables viewing and installing operating system updates across multiple endpoints. Software deployment functionality allows applications to be installed or removed remotely on managed systems.

The platform also provides automated reporting, alerting based on system performance and status, and support for PowerShell scripting to automate administrative tasks. Remote access functionality is included to allow administrators to connect to managed endpoints.

==== Community Edition ====
MSP360 RMM Community Edition is a free version of the platform designed for managed service providers. It offers a limited set of core remote monitoring and management features, including basic monitoring, alerting, and remote access functionality. The Community Edition is intended for small MSPs, testing environments, and product evaluation, and is offered with predefined usage limitations.

==== Licensing ====
MSP360 RMM is licensed using a per-administrator model, with each license allowing an unlimited number of managed endpoints per administrator. The product is available with a free 15-day trial. MSP360 Connect remote access functionality is included as part of the MSP360 RMM licensing model, allowing remote connections to managed machines without additional cost. MSP360 also offers a Community Edition of its RMM product, which is available free of charge under specific usage limitations.

=== MSP360 Connect ===
MSP360 Connect
- Developer: MSP360
- Release: August 2017; 9 years ago
- Operating system: Windows Server, Windows, macOS, iOS, Android
- Type: Remote administration
- Website: www.msp360.com/connect/

MSP360 Connect (formerly Remote Desktop) is a remote access and remote control computer software, allowing for maintenance of computers and other devices. MSP360 Connect is built for MSPs, IT teams, help desk technicians, businesses, and personal use. MSP360 Connect supports Windows 7/8/10/11, Windows Server 2008/2008 R2/2012/2012 R2/2016/2019/2022, macOS 10.8 or newer, iOS, Android.

==== Features ====
MSP360 Connect has basic features that are available in all three plans (Free, Pro, and Managed) and features that are only available in the Pro and the Managed versions. The basic feature set includes real-time connection based on the WebRTC technology, 2FA, SSL-encrypted internal and external connections, password-level security to ensure full data protection, file transfer, session recording, text and voice chat. In addition to the basic feature set, the Pro version provides unattended access to set up a remote session without a connection partner on the other end. The Managed version is integrated into the management console, so the user can oversee, run and manage remote connections from one place. It also allows to connect to an unlimited number of endpoints with no limits.

==== Licensing ====
MSP360 Connect is available in three plans: Free, Pro and Managed. Free plan is made for personal usage and is available at no cost. The Pro plan supports the per admin pricing model with annual subscription. The Managed is available in the per admin pricing model with both monthly and annual subscription options. Both Connect Pro and Managed licenses come with a fully functional free 15-day trial.

== Other Products ==
CloudBerry Backup is an online backup software with free and paid licensing options that supports both local backups and cloud storage services like AWS, Microsoft Azure, Backblaze B2, Wasabi, Google Cloud Storage. CloudBerry Backup supports Windows, Linux, Mac, Hyper-V, and VMware. CloudBerry Explorer is a Windows software with free and paid licensing options for managing files between local storage and remote online storage. Versions are available for Amazon S3, Microsoft Azure, Google Cloud, and OpenStack. CloudBerry Drive is a software that mounts cloud storage on a Windows desktop or server. The product allows customers to work with cloud storage as though it were local storage.

== Partners ==
MSP360 is an Amazon Advanced Technology Partner. The company also has established partnerships with Microsoft Azure, Google Cloud Platform, Backblaze B2, Wasabi, Autotask, ConnectWise, and others.

== See also ==
- Backup
- List of backup software
- List of online backup services
- File synchronization
- Disk image
- List of disk imaging software
