= BackupPC =

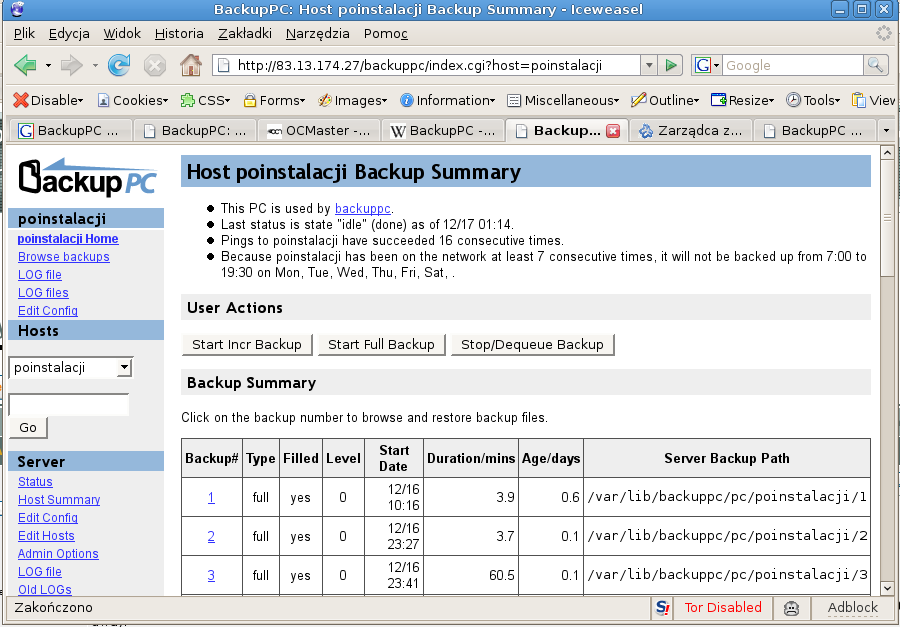
- Original author: Craig Barratt
- Developer: G.W. Haywood
- Release: September 21, 2001; 25 years ago
- Stable release: 4.4.0 / June 20, 2020; 6 years ago
- Preview release: 4.4.1rc1 / November 13, 2025; 10 months ago
- Written in: Perl
- Operating system: Cross-platform
- Type: Backup
- License: GPL 3
- Website: backuppc.github.io/backuppc
- Repository: github.com/backuppc/backuppc

BackupPC is a free disk-to-disk backup software suite with a web-based frontend. The cross-platform server will run on any Linux, Solaris, or UNIX-based server. No client is necessary, as the server is itself a client for several protocols that are handled by other services native to the client OS. In 2007, BackupPC was mentioned as one of the three most well known open-source backup software, even though it is one of the tools that are "so amazing, but unfortunately, if no one ever talks about them, many folks never hear of them".

Data deduplication reduces the disk space needed to store the backups in the disk pool. It is possible to use it as D2D2T solution, if the archive function of BackupPC is used to back up the disk pool to tape. BackupPC is not a block-level backup system like Ghost4Linux but performs file-based backup and restore. Thus it is not well suited to the backup of disk images or raw disk partitions.

BackupPC is published under the GNU General Public License.

In June 2025 Dr. Barratt handed over the task of maintenance to G.W. Haywood, who published the first Release Candidate for BackupPC version 4.4.1 on 13 November, 2025.

== Security ==
The BackupPC server must be able to reach the machines that it has to back up, but the machines to be backed up do not need to be able to reach the BackupPC server. This is because, at the beginning of a backup session, a connection is established from the BackupPC machine to the hosts to be backed up and all the data will be transferred via this connection. The BackupPC server can therefore be protected from its clients, for example by a NAT firewall. This can make it a very secure solution for backing up computers in a network potentially at risk of compromise, with the BackupPC server in a secured zone of the same network -- it could be at the same physical location as the computers being backed up or it could be elsewhere. Because of the deduplication, aged backups (for example daily for a week, weekly for a month, monthly for a year and yearly) can be kept using very little extra storage capacity. For still better security, more than one BackupPC server (perhaps sited in physically separate locations) could back up the same set of computers, perhaps on different schedules.

For ease of use BackupPC offers a Web interface for control, monitoring, and to adjust the configuration. However this is not required for BackupPC's core backup functionality. The more paranoid user may not wish to run the Web server component (usually Apache) during routine operation. Configuration adjustments can if required be made using a simple text editor. BackupPC provides command-line utilities to control and monitor the backup server without using the Web interface, but after the initial configuration normal backup operations are completely automatic. Although it is recommended to check regularly that backups are being properly made, not even the command-line utilities are essential because the backup server can be configured to send to an administrator by email warnings of any problems which it detects.

== Documentation ==
BackupPC provides extensive documentation, both online and included with the distributed source code.

== Operating Systems and Protocols Supported ==
BackupPC can back up Unix-like systems such as Linux, BSD, and OS X, as well as Microsoft Windows shares, with minimal configuration.

The most frequently used underlying protocols and tools for backing up include rsync over Secure Shell (SSH), Network File System V4 and GNU tar. These tools are normally found on Unix-like systems but on Windows, third party implementations of tar, rsync, and SSH (such as Cygwin) are required to utilize those protocols.

BackupPC can use Server Message Block (SMB) software that can back up network shares made available by client computers running Windows. This requires no extra software on the Windows clients. However the SMB protocol brings with it a performance penalty together with certain limitations, and in the past there have been a few issues backing up Windows with the SMB software. This is an important area of new development.

== Protocol choice ==
The choice between tar and rsync is dictated by the hardware and bandwidth available to the client. Clients backed up by rsync use considerably more CPU time than client machines using tar or SMB. Clients using SMB or tar use considerably more bandwidth than clients using rsync. These trade-offs are inherent in the differences between the protocols. Using tar or SMB transfers each file in its entirety, using little CPU but maximum bandwidth. The rsync method calculates checksums for each file on both the client machines and the backup server in a way that enables a transfer of just the differences between the two files; this uses more CPU resources, but minimizes bandwidth.

== Data storage ==
=== Version 3.x ===
BackupPC version 3.x uses a combination of hard links and compression to reduce the total disk space used for files. At the first full backup, all files are transferred to the backend, optionally compressed, and then compared. Files that are identical are hard linked, which uses only one additional directory entry. The upshot is that an astute system administrator could potentially back up ten Windows XP laptops with 10 GB of data each, and if 8 GB is repeated on each machine (Office and Windows binary files) would look like 100 GB is needed, but only 28 GB (10 × 2 GB + 8 GB) would be used. Compression of the data on the back-end will further reduce that requirement.

When browsing the backups, incremental backups are automatically filled back to the previous full backup. So every backup appears to be a full and complete set of data.

=== Version 4.x ===
BackupPC version 4.x can still use V3.x repositories, but all new backups use a new format (seamless upgrade). The overall performance is higher than with the V3.x version.

== User support ==
BackupPC is supported by its users via the BackupPC Users' Mailing List. It is also supported commercially by G.W. Haywood.

== See also ==
- List of backup software
- Comparison of backup software
