= Cobian Backup =

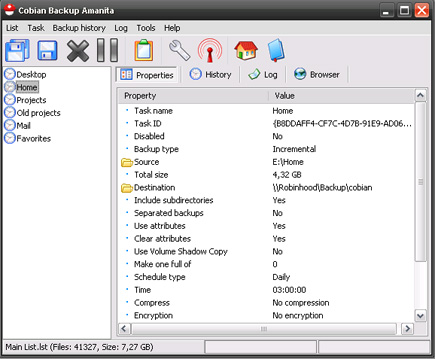
- Developer: Luis Cobian
- Final release: 11.2.0.582 / December 6, 2012; 13 years ago
- Operating system: Microsoft Windows
- Type: Backup software
- License: Version 8: Modified Mozilla Public License 1.1, Version 9 and later: Freeware
- Website: www.cobiansoft.com

Cobian Backup was a free, donation-supported backup software for Microsoft Windows. It is written in Delphi by Luis Cobian of Umeå University.

== History ==
Cobian Backup was originally released in 2000. The program was later rewritten and released under version 7. The next version (version 8) was released in 2006. Its source code was later released under the Mozilla Public License in late January 2007. However, with version 9 the author of Cobian Backup decided to switch back to a completely closed source model. Older versions will remain Open Source forever, as the release of the program under the Mozilla Public License cannot be revoked.

Development and support by the original author has been discontinued with version 11.2.0.582 and the source code has since been sold off.

In February 2021 Luis Cobian announced the start of development on a successor program, Cobian Reflector.

== Features ==
Cobian Backup supports Unicode, FTP, compression (ZIP, SQX, 7z), encryption (including Blowfish, Rijndael, DES, RSA-Rijndael), incremental and differential backup, for example a differential backup every night (which backs up user files that have changed since the last full backup) and a full backup every seventh night (backing up a full set of user files). Backups can be saved to CD, DVD, USB memory stick, a second hard drive (internal or external), etc. It supports long file names (32,000 characters) for all backup routines.

== See also ==
- List of backup software
