= Areca (disambiguation) =

Areca is a genus of single-stemmed palms.

Areca may also refer to:

- Areca nut, also known as betel nut, from the species Areca catechu
- Areca palm, a common name for Dypsis lutescens
- Areca Backup, software

== See also ==
- Arecaceae, the palm family
