= Borg (backup software) =

Deduplicating backup program

- Developer: The Borg Collective
- Release: June 11, 2015; 11 years ago

Stable release(s)
- 1.4.5 / 19 July 2026; 2 months ago

Preview release(s)
- 2.0.0b24 / 2 September 2026; 38 days ago
- Written in: Python, Cython, C
- Operating system: Linux, macOS, FreeBSD, NetBSD, OpenBSD; Experimental: Cygwin, Windows via WSL
- Type: Backup
- License: BSD 3-clause license
- Website: borgbackup.org
- Repository: github.com/borgbackup/borg

Borg (previously called Attic) is deduplicating backup software for various Unix-like operating systems. Borg is notably included in the Debian, Fedora, and Arch repositories.

== History ==
Attic
- Original author: Jonas Borgström
- Release: March 14, 2010; 16 years ago

Final release(s)
- 0.16 / May 16, 2015; 11 years ago
- Written in: Python, C
- Operating system: Linux, FreeBSD, OS X
- Size: 86 KB
- Type: Backup
- License: BSD
- Website: attic-backup.org
- Repository: github.com/borgbackup/borg

Attic development began in 2010 and was accepted to Debian in August 2013. Attic was available from pip and notably part of Debian, Ubuntu, Arch and Slackware.

In 2015, Attic was forked as "Borg" to support a "more open, faster paced development", according to its developers. Many issues in Attic have been fixed in this fork, but backward compatibility with the original program has been lost (a non-reversible upgrade process exists). Borg 1.0.0 was finally released on 5 March 2016.

As of April 2021, the attic website was removed.

The next major Borg version, 2.0, in beta since 2022, will break backward compatibility again, requiring a non-reversible upgrade process.

As of 2024, Borg is actively developed by many contributors, while Attic is no longer available. Stable releases can be found in various Linux distributions such as Arch Linux, Debian, Fedora, OpenSUSE, Ubuntu, as well as in the ports collection of various BSD derivatives and through Homebrew for macOS. The project also offers pre-built binaries for Linux, FreeBSD, and macOS.

== Design ==
Borg offers efficient, deduplicated, compressed and (optionally) encrypted and authenticated backups.

A backup includes metadata like owner/group, permissions, POSIX ACLs and Extended file attributes. It handles special files also - like hardlinks, symlinks, devices files, etc. Internally it represents the files in an archive as a stream of metadata, similar to tar and unlike tools such as git. The Borg project has created extensive documentation of the internal workings.

It uses a rolling hash to implement data deduplication for all data in single repository. Compression defaults to lz4, encryption is AES (via OpenSSL) authenticated by a HMAC.

== Frontends ==
Since Borg is essentially a command line program, several GUI frontends for Borg exist. Desktop applications like Vorta and Pika Backup, as well as many web interfaces, add features on top of Borg. See the community pages for an updated list.

== See also ==
- List of backup software
- Comparison of backup software
