= Atera =

Atera may refer to:

- Atera Networks, IT management software
- Atera (restaurant), in New York City, US
- Atera Seven Falls, a waterfall in Japan
