= Zmanda =

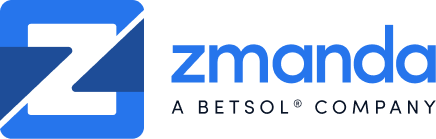
- Type: Private company
- Industry: Open Source Enterprise Backup and Recovery
- Founded: 2005
- Headquarters: Broomfield, Colorado
- Key people: Ashok Reddy (CEO); Chandor Kant (Founder)
- Products: Amanda Community; Zmanda EBR; Zmanda Recovery Manager; Zmanda Pro
- Website: www.zmanda.com

Zmanda Recovery Manager
- Release: 2008
- Written in: Perl
- Available in: English
- Type: Backup software
- License: GNU General Public License
- Website: www.zmanda.com

Zmanda Inc. is an open-source software and Cloud backup software company. It is headquartered in the United States. In partnership with open source companies such as Sun and MySQL, the company contributed to open source projects. Zmanda was acquired by Betsol in May, 2018.

== History ==
Zmanda was founded in May, 2005, in Sunnyvale, California. It disclosed a round of $2 million of funding in October, 2005, with an investor Chander Kant who was also an executive at the time. Pete Childers became chief executive in May, 2007, and then resigned in July of that year, with Kant then becoming chief executive.

Zmanda develops and maintains the open source backup tools Advanced Maryland Automatic Network Disk Archiver (Amanda), and the Zmanda Recovery Manager (ZRM) for MySQL, an open source relational database management system. ZRM included a graphical user interface for installation and management. ZRM is written in the Perl programming language, and released with a GNU General Public License. Source code is kept on GitHub.

The company was named one of MySQL partners of the year in 2008. Within two weeks of the announced that Sun Microsystems would acquire MySQL AB (the company that developed MySQL), Sun announced a partnership to sell ZRM. A backup agent allowed integration with the NetBackup product from Symantec. Version 3.0 of ZRM was released in 2009, including support for the Ubuntu distribution of the Linux operating system.

In early 2009, the company announced a remote backup service for cloud computing. Zmanda developed the open source ZCloud API, announced in 2009, to enable backup software vendors to integrate software with public and private storage clouds. Like many open source firms, Zmanda generated revenue by selling products built on the open source codebase as well as by providing services and support to those customers who buy these products. Zmanda offers an annual subscription fee model similar to those by Red Hat and MySQL.

In 2010, Zmanda announced an option to support IBM Tivoli Storage Manager in ZRM. After Sun was acquired by Oracle Corporation in 2010, it continued to promote ZRM. Zmanda was acquired by Carbonite, Inc. in 2012, and then Betsol in May, 2018. Betsol, headed by Ashok Reddy, had also acquired the backup software called Rebit from Carbonite in 2017. When the 4.0 version was announced in 2020, the location given was Broomfield, Colorado, where Betsol is located, Betsol calls the software Zmanda, releasing version 4.1 in September, 2021 which included support for Microsoft Azure cloud.

== Products ==
=== Zmanda Pro ===
Zmanda Pro
- Developer: Zmanda Inc.
- Release: 2008
- Operating system: Windows XP, Vista, Windows 7, Windows Server 2003/08
- Platform: Windows
- Available in: English, German, Japanese, Korean, Chinese
- Type: Online backup service, Online file storage, Backup & Recovery
- License: Proprietary
- Website: www.zmanda.com

Zmanda Pro is a backup software by Zmanda (a BETSOL product) which enables enterprises and SMBs to back up their data to cloud storage. The software uses the Amazon S3 service from Amazon Web Services or Google Cloud Storage as the cloud storage service but also supports private cloud solutions such as OpenStack Swift or Walrus by Eucalyptus via the open source ZCloud API. As of March 2011, the software runs only on Windows platforms. For non-Windows platforms the company offers the open source Advanced Maryland Automatic Network Disk Archiver with Amazon S3 as the storage location. Zmanda was acquired by BETSOL on Feb 27, 2018.

==== Reception ====
The product was featured by Microsoft on its website. In August 2010, The Motley Fool reviewed the product and called it a product which make the backups "simple and inexpensive".

== See also ==
- List of online backup services
- Comparison of online backup services
