= Flyback =

The term flyback may refer to:

- Flyback chronograph, a single-push-button clock for stopping, resetting and restarting time measurement
- Flyback converter, a type of DC to DC converter
- Flyback diode, also known as a "freewheel diode", a used to protect against spikes from inductive loads
- Flyback transformer, used to drive cathode ray tubes
- FlyBack, an open source backup utility
