= Duplicity (software) =

Type of computer program

- Release: August 26, 2002; 23 years ago
- Stable release: 3.0.6.3 / 5 December 2025; 6 months ago
- Written in: Python
- Operating system: Cross-platform (POSIX)
- Type: Backup software
- License: GNU General Public License
- Website: duplicity.us
- Repository: gitlab.com/duplicity/duplicity

Duplicity is a software suite that provides encrypted, digitally signed, versioned, local or remote backup of files requiring little of the remote server. Released under the terms of the GNU General Public License (GPL), Duplicity is free software.

Duplicity operates under a scheme where the first archive is a complete (full) backup, and subsequent (incremental) backups only add differences from the latest full or incremental backup. Chains consisting of a full backup and a series of incremental backups can be recovered to the point in time that any of the incremental steps were taken. If any of the incremental backups are missing, then the incremental backups following it cannot be reconstructed. It does this using GnuPG, librsync and tar. To transmit data to remote backup repositories, it can use SSH/SCP/SFTP, rsync, FTP, IMAP, Amazon S3, Google Cloud Storage amongst others. Even more backends may be used via the Rclone backend.

Duplicity works best under Unix-like operating systems (such as Linux, BSD, and Mac OS X), though it can be used with Windows under Cygwin or the Windows Subsystem for Linux. Currently duplicity supports deleted files, full Unix permissions, directories, and symbolic links, fifos, and device files, but not hard links.

Déjà Dup is a graphical user interface for Duplicity.

Duply is a shell frontend for Duplicity adding support for profiles and batch commands.

== See also ==
- List of backup software
- Duplicati is a C# re-implementation of Duplicity
