= Binary backup =

Binary backup may refer to:

- A Backup consisting of exact, byte-level copies of the original data.
- A Byte-Level Incremental backup, which examines file differences at the byte level (in contrast with a Block-Level Incremental Backup).
