= Craig Barratt =

Australian businessman

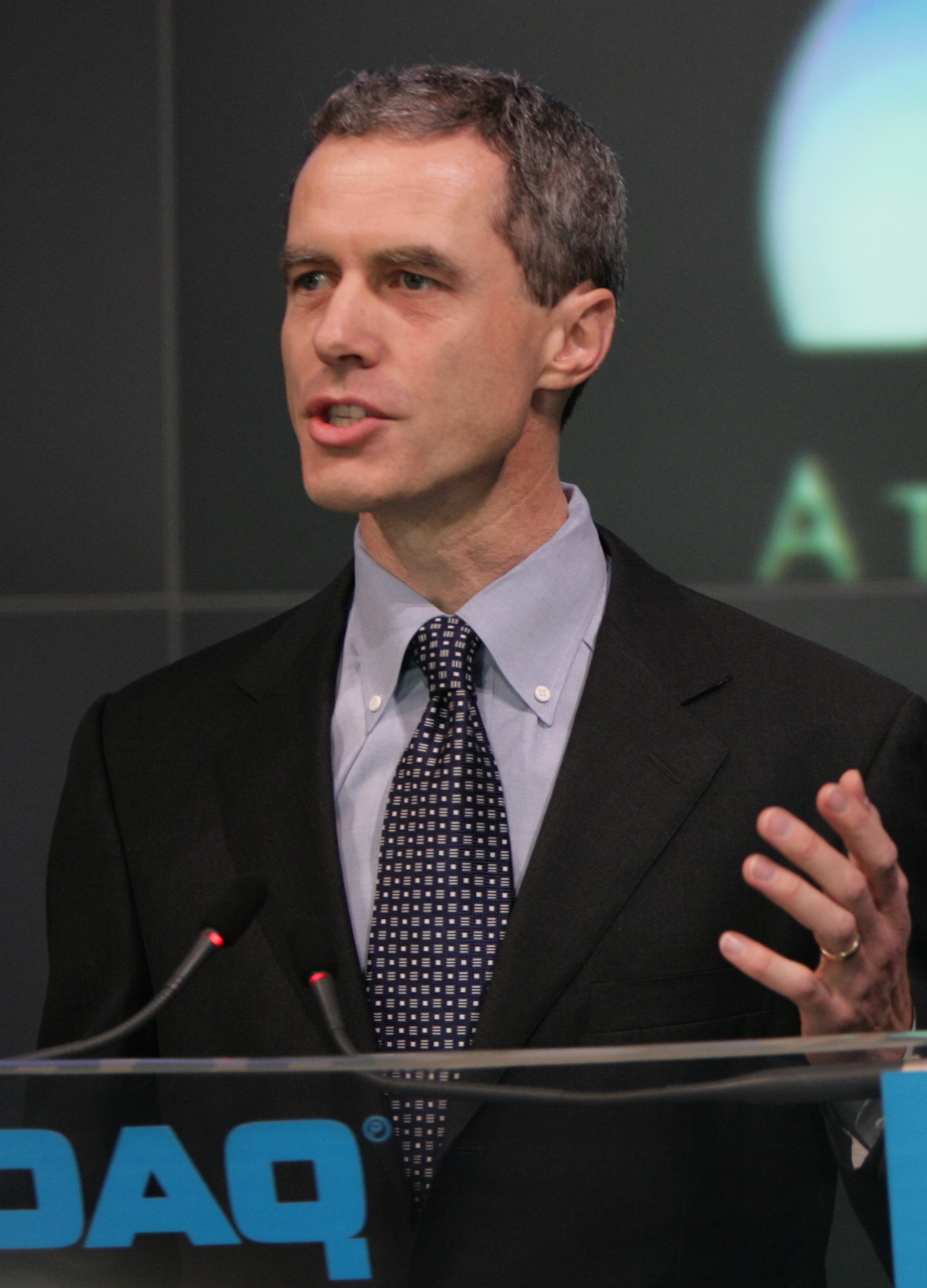
- Craig Barratt opening NASDAQ market 2006
- Born: 12 May 1962 (age 64); Sydney Australia
- Education: Stanford University; University of Sydney
- Board member of: Intuitive Surgical; Intel

Craig H. Barratt (born 12 May 1962) is an Australian technology executive who was Chief Executive Officer at Barefoot Networks until its acquisition by Intel in July 2019. Following the acquisition, and until his departure in May 2020, he was senior vice president and general manager of the Connectivity Group under Intel's Data Platforms Group.

Barratt previously was the CEO of Atheros from 2003, through its IPO in 2004 until its acquisition by Qualcomm in 2011. He continued as President of Qualcomm Atheros upon the close of the acquisition in May 2011 until early 2013. Barratt then was Senior Vice President, Access and Energy, at Google from 2012 until 2016.

== Intel Board Chair ==
Barratt joined Intel's board in November, 2025 as an independent director. On March 3, 2026 it was announced that Barratt would succeed Frank Yeary as the chair of Intel's board.

== Open source software ==
Barratt is the author of BackupPC, an open source backup system. He is the author of the original version of PSfrag, a LaTeX package. He has also contributed to Rsync and other open source projects.

== Education ==
Barratt holds Ph.D. and Master of Science degrees from Stanford University, as well as a Bachelor of Engineering degree in electrical engineering and a Bachelor of Science degree in pure mathematics and physics from the University of Sydney in Australia. He completed high school at Barker College in 1979.

Barratt is the co-author of a book on Linear Controller Design, which is now freely available online.
