= Synchronize It =

File synchronization software

Synchronize It!
- Developer(s): Grig Software
- Final release: 3.5.1698 / December 7, 2009
- Preview release: 3.5.1701 / February 28, 2010
- Operating system: Microsoft Windows
- Type: File synchronization
- License: Commercial
- Website: www.grigsoft.com/wndsync.htm

Synchronize It! is a file synchronization software which allows users to compare and synchronize folders that can be stored on the same computer, on different computers, in archives or on FTP sites. Various synchronization modes (actions) and comparison rules are available.

== Features ==
=== Folders comparison ===
The most common application of Synchronize It! is to compare two folders — a source folder and a target folder. Users can choose whether subfolders should be included (allowing exclusion of specific subfolders), whether only matching folders should be compared and users can apply file filters. Various actions and comparison modes are available (see below). Custom sessions can be saved and organized into projects.

=== Compare folder with archive ===
Zip archives are supported internally and external archivers can be used to support other archive types. Archives support allows users to:

- create backup archives from folders;
- compare folders content with archived version and update it;
- compare and synchronize two archives with each other.

=== Command line switches ===
Synchronize It! can also be started and configured from command line. This allows automation and implementation in other tools, such as Total Commander.

=== Synchronize non-connected PCs ===
The package feature can be used to synchronize distant, non-connected PCs. A list of the files contained in the source folder is stored in a small package file, that can be kept on a USB stick. The package is then synchronized with the target folder on another computer. Files only present or modified on the target computer will be packed into the package. A package hence contains only the files that are different and not the entire folder, which makes it a tool to keep non-connected computers synchronized (e.g. a PC at work and a PC at home).

=== Reporting and printing ===
Results form comparison can be printed or exported and published as HTML reports.

=== Portability ===
Synchronize It! also works without installation and is only 2.5 MB in size. It can be run directly from a USB stick.

== Actions ==
The following actions / synchronization modes are available:

Action	source only	target only	source newer	target newer
Synchronize	copy >>	copy <<	copy >>	copy <<
Update target	copy >>	---	copy >>	---
Backup copy	copy >>	delete	copy >>	---
Duplicate	copy >>	delete	copy >>	copy >>

== Comparison rules ==
Rule	Description
Date^{1} + size	Default rule, suitable for most cases: files are same, if they have same date and size.
Date^{1}_or_content	Modification of default rule, suitable if you think you have same files with different dates. Files with same date and size are still considered as same, but in addition files with same size and different dates are compared byte-by-byte to check if they are same.
Content	Strict rule, which does binary comparison for all file pairs. Using this rule will make synchronization slower. This rule is ideally suited for CD verification after burning
Size only	Files are considered to be same if they have same size. It is only good for some log files and similar.

^{1} Date comparison in all rules takes into account global time-related options, such as Ignore 2 secs difference etc.

== See also ==
- File synchronization
- Comparison of file synchronization software
- Windows Live FolderShare
- SyncToy
- Beyond Compare
- GoodSync
