= Remote monitoring and management =

Management software

Remote monitoring and management (RMM) is a category of information technology (IT) management software that enables internal IT departments and external managed service providers (MSPs) to monitor, manage, and support endpoints such as servers, desktops, laptops, and mobile devices remotely by means of locally installed agents that can be accessed by a management service provider. RMM software provides centralized oversight of distributed systems, automates routine maintenance, and allows proactive support without requiring technicians to be physically present at the endpoint location.

== Overview ==
RMM tools deploy lightweight agents on client devices, which communicate status and event data back to a centralized management console. From this console, administrators can remotely troubleshoot issues, push updates, enforce policies, and generate performance and security reports. Originally developed for MSPs serving small and medium-sized businesses, RMM platforms are now also used by enterprise IT teams and organizations with remote or hybrid workforces.

== Functions ==
Core functions of RMM software typically include:

- Monitoring and alerting: Continuous tracking of system performance, availability, and security events with notifications for anomalies.
- Patch management: Automated distribution and installation of operating system and application updates.
- Remote access: Secure connections for troubleshooting and configuration without on-site presence.
- Asset and inventory management: Centralized tracking of hardware, software, and licensing.
- Automation and scripting: Predefined or custom scripts to remediate common issues and enforce policies at scale.
- Reporting and analytics: Historical data and dashboards for compliance, performance, and service-level visibility.
- Integration with PSA systems: Connection with professional services automation (PSA) tools for ticketing, billing, and service workflows.

== Market and adoption ==
The RMM Software as a Service (SaaS) market has grown significantly as IT outsourcing and remote work have expanded. Industry research estimated the global market at approximately USD 5.4 billion in 2024, with forecasts projecting it to exceed USD 12 billion by 2033, representing a compound annual growth rate (CAGR) of 10–15%.

Adoption is especially strong among MSPs serving small and medium-sized businesses, though enterprise IT teams increasingly use RMM platforms to support geographically dispersed workforces. Cloud-based deployment has become the dominant model, accounting for more than 60% of RMM usage.

Regional adoption is led by North America, followed by Europe and Asia-Pacific, with growth tied to digital transformation initiatives and the increasing need for cybersecurity and compliance management.

== Benefits ==
RMM platforms provide several operational and financial benefits:

- Efficiency: Automates routine maintenance tasks, reducing technician workload.
- Scalability: Enables centralized management of thousands of endpoints.
- Proactive support: Identifies and resolves issues before they cause downtime.
- Security: Improves patching consistency and reduces vulnerability exposure.
- Cost savings: Lowers travel requirements and reduces time-to-resolution.

== Challenges ==
Despite advantages, organizations face challenges with RMM adoption:

- Complexity of integration with other IT management systems.
- Upfront investment and subscription costs.
- Training requirements for staff to effectively use automation and scripting.
- Security risks if RMM tools themselves are exploited, as they provide high-level access to networks and endpoints.

== Evolution ==
RMM solutions evolved from early network monitoring tools in the late 1990s and early 2000s, expanding to include patching, automation, and PSA integrations. The shift to cloud computing accelerated the transition from on-premises installations to SaaS-based platforms. In the 2020s, vendors began incorporating artificial intelligence (AI) and machine learning (ML) capabilities to improve anomaly detection, predictive maintenance, and automation.

== Prominent Vendors ==
Several companies develop and market RMM platforms. Prominent vendors include:

- ScreenConnect
- ConnectWise Automate (formerly LabTech)
- Kaseya VSA (including Datto RMM)
- N-able (formerly SolarWinds)
- NinjaOne
- Atera
- ManageEngine RMM Central
- Open Text ZENworks
- MSP360

== See also ==
- Network management
- Network monitoring
- Application service management
- Application performance management
- Managed services
- Information technology outsourcing
- Remote administration
