= Bvckup 2 =

Commercial backup tool

- Developer(s): IO Bureau SA
- Stable release: 82.19 / 22 March 2024; 11 months ago
- Operating system: Windows Vista and later; Windows Server 2008 or later
- Platform: IA-32 and x86-64
- Type: Backup software
- License: Trialware
- Website: bvckup2.com

Bvckup 2 is a backup software for the Windows NT family, developed by Swiss-based IO Bureau SA. It replicates files from one location to another in their original format and uses delta copying to speed up its operation. The program supports scheduling, removable device tracking, using Shadow Copy service to transfer open or locked files, move and renaming detection, security attribute cloning, and email alerts.
