= Dmailer =

- Type: Privately held
- Industry: Information technology
- Founded: 2001
- Defunct: 2018
- Headquarters: Marseille, France
- Key people: Lucas Leonardi, CEO; Brigitte Leonardi, Founder; Philippe Leca, CFO; Eric Dumas, CTO; Anthony Reyes, EVP Marketing & Services
- Products: Backup software, synchronization software
- Website: www.dmailer.com

Dmailer was a French company which specialized in portable backup and synchronization software for devices, including USB flash drives, memory cards, external hard disk drives, MP3 players, embedded phone memories, SIM cards and flash-based memory cards for mobile phones.

Serving both consumers and original equipment manufacturers (OEMs), Dmailer designed, developed, manufactured and marketed portable backup and synchronization software. Dmailer software products were bundled with SanDisk, Western Digital, Verbatim Corporation, Imation, LaCie, Lexar and other manufacturers’ portable storage products worldwide. Dmailer licensed its patent-pending synchronization engine technology to a number of companies.

Dmailer’s data backup software supports both local and online backup. On March 23, 2010, Dmailer launched a free version of its backup software (Dmailer Backup v3). The software application allows users to perform live backup and online backup of any storage device, as well as to back up PC and Mac platforms locally, via USB drive, CD, mobile device or external hard drive. No software installation is needed to restore data.

It included 2 GB of free storage online through Dmailer Online, an online storage service that backed up secure copies to a remote server for access from any computer. Dmailer Backup v3 restores data to its original location or elsewhere and also performs customized backup.

All product customer support, the Dmailer Sync Product and Dmailer Online service are discontinued. Dmailer technical assets have been bought by Gemalto and are now included in the YuuWaa service.

== Corporation ==
=== Company history ===
Established in 2001, Dmailer’s head office was located in Marseille, France, with a regional American office in Chicago, Illinois and a local presence in Australia. The company was founded in December 2001 by Brigitte Léonardi, winner of the "National Contest for Assistance to the Creation of Innovative Technology Companies", awarded by the French Ministry for Research (ANVAR).

=== Management team ===
Dmailer’s executives represented nine nationalities and ten spoken languages and international business experience spanning America (North and South), Europe and Asia Pacific.

- Lucas Leonardi (CEO)
- Philippe Leca (CFO)
- Benoit Gantaume (CSO)
- Eric Dumas (CTO)
- Anthony Reyes (EVP Marketing & Services)

== Products ==
Dmailer offered backup, synchronization and multimedia software. The synchronization engine was included in some USB flash drives, memory cards, and external hard disk drives. Products included Dmailer Sync, Dmailer Backup, the Dmailer Online service, and Mediamove.

=== Dmailer Backup ===
Dmailer Backup
- Developer: Dmailer
- Stable release: 3.2.17592 / July 15, 2010
- Operating system: Microsoft Windows, OS X
- Available in: English, Czech, Norwegian, Swedish, French, Spanish, Danish, Chinese, Japanese, Korean, Arabic, Turkish, Deutsch, Dutch, Italian, Russian, Portuguesh, Polish
- Type: Backup
- License: Commercial
- Website: https://web.archive.org/web/20100106223008/http://www.dmailer.com/

Dmailer Backup, developed by Dmailer, was a backup software for Microsoft Windows and OS X operating systems provisory that could back up and restore all of the data of the computer. There were two modes in the application: an Automatic mode, which launched a backup for all the user's data (Documents, Video, Music), and a Custom mode to choose what data would be backed up.

This software included an Online service, called Dmailer Online, with 2 GB for free (lifetime), which allowed the user to send online all the existing backup from the app. This service has been suspended, and data cannot be retrieved anymore.

From version 3.0, the application is free to use, without license costs.

== Product history ==
Dmailer first launched an email management application in 2001. In French, “demêler” means “To sort, to organize” and it was precisely the goal of the first software of the company: help people manage their emails.

In 2004, the company developed its synchronization software called “Dmailer Sync” that let the users synchronize their PCs to a portable USB drive. In the same year, Dmailer made its first OEM deal with SanDisk and developed a product called “Cruzer Sync”, which is basically Dmailer Sync but branded for SanDisk Cruzer drives.

In 2006, Dmailer started shipping Dmailer Sync along with Western Digital hard drives branded as WD Sync. In 2007 and 2008, Dmailer Sync was shipped along with Lacie and Lexar drives as “Lacie sync” and “Lexar sync” respectively.

In 2009, Dmailer came out with its backup software called “Dmailer Backup” which is shipped with Maxell, EdgeTech, Verbatim and Lexar portable drives. Dmailer Backup is also available for free as a standalone product for customers.

Both Dmailer Sync and Dmailer Backup are coupled with “Dmailer Online”, an online storage service that lets the users backup their files online in secure servers for anytime and anywhere access.

In 2009, Dmailer announced MediaMove. It is media management software that lets the user preview media files, move them from a phone, camera or MP3 to a PC or Mac and share them with friends or upload them to online media-sharing services.

== Product reviews ==
- On April 1, 2010, “Addictive Tips” reviewed Dmailer Backup software and called it a “Kick-Ass backup tool”
- On April 7, 2010, “SmashingApps” called Dmailer backup as an alternative to DropBox
- On May 7, 2010 Jon Jacobi from PC World reviewed Dmailer Backup and said that it is far friendlier and well worth a look

Dmailer products are bundled with SanDisk, Western Digital, Verbatim Corporation, Imation, LaCie, Lexar and other manufacturers of portable storage products worldwide. Dmailer licenses its patent-pending synchronization engine technology to a number of companies.

== Features ==
Dmailer Backup:

- Custom configuration: backup by file type, size and date
- Manage multiple backups, maintain log files and view backup summaries
- Password protection and AES 128-bit encryption
- Automatic versioning controls
- File selection for automatic and continuous backup
- 2 GB of free online storage
- Online folder sharing
- Supports Windows XP, Vista and 7
- Supports Mac OS 10.5 and 10.6
- Available in 19 languages
- 600-pixel vertical resolutions for Netbooks

== Awards ==
Dmailer received Deloitte’s Technology Fast50 in France and Technology Fast500 EMEA awards in 2008 and 2009, respectively.

== See also ==
- List of backup software
