= Argentum Backup =

Backup software for Microsoft Windows

- Developer(s): Argentum
- Initial release: October 2000; 24 years ago
- Stable release: 3.00
- Written in: C++ with STL and VCL
- Operating system: Microsoft Windows
- Size: 1.2 MB
- Type: Backup software
- Website: www.argentuma.com

Argentum Backup is a backup software program for Microsoft Windows, produced by Argentum. Argentum Backup copies files into Zip compressed folders, as well as provides native file copying. Backup copies can be created both manually and automatically on the schedule. The product features a number of backup task templates to back up common file locations on computers with Microsoft Windows. Argentum Backup has won PC Magazine Editors' Choice award and PC World Best Buy award.

== Features ==
The company and reviewers emphasize the overall raw simplicity and ease of use of the user interface of Argentum Backup software, aimed first for beginners and novice computer users. The company also stresses the minimalistic nature of the program and very fast backup operation due to the proprietary backup engine written in highly optimized and profiled C++/STL code. Other notable features include:

- 64-bit extensions (Zip64) to Zip format are supported to create large, multi-gigabyte Zip backups.
- Argentum Backup supports strong 128-bit and 256-bit AES symmetric encryption to securely protect sensitive data when backing up into Zip files. AES 256-bit strong encryption methods provide significantly greater cryptographic security than the traditional Zip encryption.
- A set of built-in backup templates to recognize and back up locations of valuable data on Windows XP, Windows 7, Windows 10, and other Microsoft Windows platforms.
- Stacking feature which allows to have several backup copies - each backup copy for a particular point of time, to allow to get back to any of them whenever required.
- XHTML reports of backup activity with actions and problems logged and detailed summary statistics shown.

== See also ==
- Backup software
- Minimalism
