= Backup Express =

Backup software

Catalogic DPX
- Developer: Catalogic Software
- Stable release: 4.14 / December 2025
- Operating system: Windows, Linux (RedHat, CentOS, Oracle Linux, SUSE, Ubuntu, Debian), Linux OES, FreeBSD, IBM AIX
- Type: Backup
- License: Proprietary
- Website: catalogicsoftware.com/dpx

Catalogic DPX (formerly BEX or Backup Express) is an enterprise-level data protection tool that backs up and restores data and applications for a variety of operating systems. It has data protection, disaster recovery and business continuity planning capabilities. Catalogic DPX protects physical servers or virtual machines on VMWare vSphere and Microsoft Hyper-V hypervisors, supports many database applications, including Oracle, SQL Server, SharePoint, Exchange, and SAP HANA. DPX supports agent-based or agent-less backups. Users can map to and use a backed up version of the database if something goes wrong with the primary version. DPX is managed from a single console and catalog. This allows for centralized control of both tape-based and disk-based data protection jobs across heterogeneous operating systems. DPX can protect data centers, remote sites and supports recovery from DR. DPX can protect data to disk, tape or cloud. It is used for various recovery use cases including file, application, BMR, VM or DR. DPX can spin up VMs from backup images, recover physical servers, bring up applications online from snapshot based backups, it can be used to recover from Ransomware.

== Supported applications ==
According to the DPX Interface Guide, DPX contains interfaces to the following software and database management systems: DB2, Lotus Notes, Microsoft Exchange, Micro Focus Groupwise, Micro Focus Open Enterprise Services (OES), Oracle, SAP, SharePoint, and SQL Server. For Oracle, DPX provides cloning capabilities. For Microsoft Exchange, SQL Server, and Oracle, DPX provides read/write access to recovery points. SQL log truncation, Rollback in time, point in time recovery for SQL, granular recovery of Exchange, SharePoint and SQL is available.

== Storage media ==
DPX uses tape, tape library (jukebox), virtual tape library (VTL), disk (local, NetApp, Dell EMC, HP, Data Domain), disk-to-disk-to-tape, cloud as a backup target. DPX will back up to any disk with vStor or NetApp FAS storage.

== Structure ==
DPX infrastructure has three types of components:

Master Server
Controls all backup management tasks, catalog, scheduling, job execution, and distributed processing.
Device Server; Advanced Server; Open Storage Server; or vStor Server
Handles backup media – either tape or disk.
Client Node
Any computer in a DPX enterprise from which data is backed up is considered a DPX client node.

== Catalogic Software history ==
In October 2013, Syncsort sold its data protection business to an investor group led by Bedford Venture Partners and Windcrest Partners. The spun off Data Protection business is now called Catalogic Software, the company that produces Catalogic DPX.

On 4 June 2018, it was reported that Catalogic Software had taken an equity stake in the European data protection company Storware.

== See also ==
- List of backup software
