= FlyBack =

Open-source backup utility for Linux

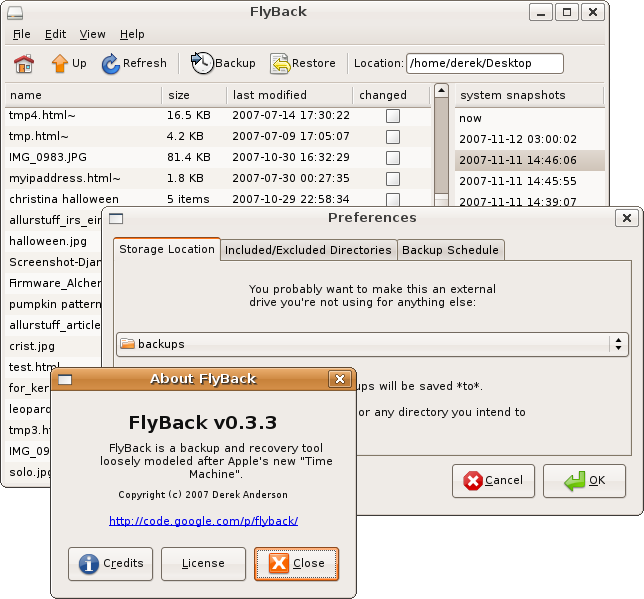
- FlyBack screenshot
- Developer(s): Derek Anderson
- Stable release: v0.6.5 / May 5, 2010; 14 years ago
- Repository: code.google.com/p/flyback
- Written in: Python
- Operating system: Linux
- Type: Backup software
- License: GPL
- Website: code.google.com/p/flyback

FlyBack is an open-source backup utility for Linux based on Git and modeled loosely after Apple's Time Machine.

== Overview ==
FlyBack creates incremental backups of files, which can be restored at a later date. FlyBack presents a chronological view of a file system, allowing individual files or directories to be previewed or retrieved one at a time. Flyback was originally based on rsync when the project began in 2007, but in October 2009 it was rewritten from scratch using Git.

== User interface ==
FlyBack presents the user with a typical file-manager style view of their file system, but with additional controls allowing the user to go forward or backward in time. It shows to the user files that exist, do not exist or have changed since the last version, and allows them to preview them before deciding to restore or ignore them.

== User settings ==
FlyBack has very few settings in its preferences:

- The backup location
- Inclusion list (files or folders)
- Exclusion list (files or folders)
- When to automatically start a backup
- When to automatically delete old backups

Further, the FlyBack UI allows users to:

- Commence a backup, and
- restore all or selected files.

== Requirements ==
FlyBack is written in Python using GTK. These libraries, as well as the program Git, should be installed for the software to function properly.

== See also ==
- List of backup software
- Revision control
- Versioning file system
