= Bacula =

Free software backup utility

- Developers: Kern Sibbald and team
- Release: January 2000; 26 years ago
- Stable release: 15.0.3 / 27 March 2025; 17 months ago
- Written in: C, C++
- Operating system: Cross-platform
- Type: Backup
- License: GNU Affero General Public License v3.0
- Website: www.bacula.org

Bacula is an open-source, enterprise-level computer backup system for heterogeneous networks. It is designed to automate backup tasks that had often required intervention from a systems administrator or computer operator.

Bacula supports Linux, UNIX, Windows, and macOS backup clients, and a range of professional backup devices including tape libraries. Administrators and operators can configure the system via a command line, GUI or web interface; its back-end is a catalog of information stored by MySQL, PostgreSQL, or SQLite.

== Overview ==
Bacula is a set of computer programs for managing backup, recovery, and verification of computer data across a network—providing a backup solution for mixed operating system environments. Its modular design allows it to scale from a single-computer installation to networks of hundreds of machines. Bacula was founded by Kern Sibbald, who served as the project’s lead developer.

Bacula is open-source and released under the AGPL version 3 license with exceptions to permit linking with OpenSSL and distributing Windows binaries.

Bacula is available under a "dual license" (see Multi-licensing) AGPLv3 or Proprietary license. Several entities offer commercial support for the AGPL "Bacula community version" while Bacula Systems sells various levels of annual support contracts for "Bacula Enterprise Edition", which contains various non-GPL components developed in-house.

In common with other dual-license software, components developed for the Bacula Enterprise Edition are released into Bacula Community edition after some period of exclusivity to the proprietary version.

In January 2010 Bacula surpassed 1 million downloads according to SourceForge. Since April 2002, Bacula has over 2 million downloads, which makes it the most downloaded open-source backup program.

== Features ==
Bacula's features include:

=== Network options ===
- TCP/IP – client–server communication uses standard ports and services instead of RPC for NFS, SMB, etc.; this eases firewall administration and network security
- CRAM-MD5 – configurable client–server authentication
- GZIP/LZO – client-side compression to reduce network bandwidth consumption; this runs separate from hardware compression done by the backup device
- TLS – network communication encryption
- MD5/SHA – verify file integrity
- CRC – verify data block integrity
- PKI – backup data encryption
- NDMP – enterprise version plugin
- cloud backup with some S3 file storage services

=== Client OS ===
The client software, executed by a "file daemon" running on a Bacula client, supports multiple operating systems.

== Considerations ==
By default, Bacula's differential and incremental backups are based on system time stamps. Consequently, if you move files into an existing directory or move a whole directory into the backup FileSet after a full backup, those files may not be backed up by an incremental save because they may have old dates. You must explicitly update the date/time stamp on all moved files. Bacula versions starting with 3.0 or later support Accurate backup, which is an option that addresses this issue without requiring modification of the files timestamps. This feature should always be used if an accurate state of the filesystem is important. Which criteria should be applied is configurable, i.e. inode comparisons, modification times or md5/sha1 signatures.

== History ==
Date	Event
January 2000	Project started
April 14, 2002	First release to SourceForge.net (version 1.16)
June 29, 2006	Release 1.38.11 (Final version 1 release)
January 2007	Release 2.0.0
September 2007	Release 2.2.3
June 2008	Release 2.4.0
October 2008	Bacula Systems SA was established to provide commercial support for Bacula.
April 2009	Release 3.0.0 with new features
January 2010	Release 5.0.0 with new features
September 2010	Release 5.0.3
January 2012	Release 5.2.4 with new features
February 2012	Release 5.2.6
June 2012	Release 5.2.9
February 2013	Release 5.2.13
July 2014	Release 7.0.5 with many new features
August 2015	Release 7.2.0 with many new features
July 2017	Release 9.0.0 with many new features
December 2018	Release 9.2.0 with many new features
January 2020	Release 9.4.0 with many new features
March 2021	Release 11.0.0 with many new features
August 2022	Release 13.0.1 with many new features
March 2024	Release 15.0.2 with many new features
March 2025	Release 15.0.3 with many new features

From 2006 the Free Software Foundation Europe acted as fiduciary for copyrights held by developers of Bacula.org software. The agreement between Kern Sibbald and the FSFE was terminated in March 2015.

== Forks of Bacula ==
In 2011, Graham Keeling, a "former" Bacula community developer, released a friendly fork of Bacula.

In February 2013 a former Bacula community developer (with several other Free Software users) released Bareos as a fork of Bacula.

== See also ==
- Amanda
- Proxmox Backup Server
- Bareos
- List of backup software
- Comparison of backup software
