= Bup =

- Original author: Avery Pennarun
- Initial release: 4 January 2010; 15 years ago
- Stable release: 0.33.3 / 28 December 2023; 23 months ago
- Repository: github.com/Bup/Bup
- Written in: Python, Bash, C
- Operating system: Linux, OS X 10.4 or later, NetBSD, FreeBSD, Solaris, Windows (through Cygwin or WSL)
- Size: 405 KB
- Type: Backup
- License: LGPL version 2
- Website: bup.github.io

Bup is a Backup system written in Python. It uses several formats from Git but is capable of handling very large files like operating system images. It has block-based deduplication and optional par2-based error correction.

== History ==
Bup development began in 2010 and was accepted to Debian the same year.

== Design ==
Bup uses the git packfile format writing packfiles directly, avoiding garbage collection.

== Availability ==
Bup is available from source and notably part of the following distributions

- Debian
- Ubuntu
- Arch Linux
- pkgsrc (NetBSD etc.)

== See also ==
- List of backup software
- Comparison of backup software
