= Genie Backup Manager =

- Developer: Genie-Soft
- Stable release: 9.0.567.891 / 26 February 2014; 12 years ago
- Operating system: Microsoft Windows
- Available in: 5 languages
- Type: Backup
- License: Commercial
- Website: www.genie9.com

Genie Backup Manager, developed by Genie-soft Inc, is a backup software for Microsoft Windows operating systems that can back up and restore the whole system (operating system, applications, documents, e-mails, settings, files/folders, etc.) to many local and remote devices including internal and external hard disks, Iomega REV Disks, FTP locations, online, across network, and removable media.

The software has two interfaces, a "normal" interface and a "simple" interface, which has a more appealing appearance but fewer advanced options. The software permits backups in standard .zip files or a proprietary format, the latter of which includes an encryption option. An optional supplementary piece of software permits backups of open files.

== See also ==
- List of backup software
