= CwRsync =

cwRsync
- Developer(s): Itefix
- Stable release: 6.4.4 / July 25, 2025; 33 days ago
- Operating system: Windows
- Type: File Synchronization
- License: Commercial: rsync, Cygwin, OpenSSH and OpenSSL are free software, cwRsync Installer/Tools are proprietary
- Website: https://www.itefix.net/cwrsync

cwRsync is an implementation of rsync for Windows. Rsync uses a file transfer technology specified by the rsync algorithm, transferring only changed chunks of files over the network in a given time. cwRsync can be used for remote file backup and synchronization from/to Windows systems. cwRsync contains Cygwin DLLs and a compiled version of rsync on Cygwin. A client GUI is also provided as of the version 5.0.0.

== History ==
The first version of cwRsync was developed to address requirements of an internal project at Color Line, and was published as a free solution on the mailing list for rsync users. cwRsync quickly became very popular and is kept updated with newer versions of underlying solutions. The initial release was on March 11, 2003.

As of August 2018, the free version of cwRsync server is discontinued and the last free version 5.7.2 is no longer directly available from Itefix. At this point only the commercial binary installers of version 5.7.2 can be obtained as paid downloads. cwRsync Client remains freely available under a BSD-style licence.

== Features ==
cwRsync comes in two versions: cwRsync client and cwRsync server. You can use the cwRsync client to initiate rsync transfers from your host, while the cwRsync server makes your files/directories available for upload/download for rsync transfers. cwRsync client contains a Secure channel wrapper to set up external secure ssh channels.

Rsync client GUI has following features:

- Specify sources and destination (local, remote ssh and daemon modes)
- Specify filters and a subset of options
- Create rsync command according to your specification
- Run rsync on the fly both in production and test mode
- Create batch files for task scheduling
- Save and load your favorite rsync settings as profiles
- Language localization

== Usage note ==
cwRsync uses Cygwin conventions, which means:

- The path separator is forward slash (/), not backslash (\)
- Instead of drive letters C:/, D:/, etc, it uses /cygdrive/c/, /cygdrive/d/, etc
- Like the original rsync, text followed a colon (":") in a path name is interpreted as a computer name. This means if you use a path name like "C:/Users/Pat/My Documents", cwRsync will look for "Users/Pat/My Documents" on a computer with the network name "C" and probably fail. The correct way is to use the Cygwin path as shown above: /cygdrive/c/Users/Pat/My Documents.

== See also ==
- GS RichCopy 360
- rsync
- File Transfer Protocol
