= PSfrag =

LaTeX package

PSfrag is a LaTeX package that allows one to overlay Encapsulated PostScript (EPS) figures with arbitrary LaTeX constructions, properly aligned, scaled, and rotated. The user has to place a text tag into the EPS file and the corresponding LaTeX construction into the LaTeX file that will include the EPS file. PSfrag will remove the tag and replace it by the specified LaTeX construction.

The authors of PSfrag are Craig Barratt, Michael Grant and David Carlisle.

== Basic usage ==
- Insert a simple tag into the EPS file. The tag must be a single word, alphanumeric, and unaccented.
- Add to the LaTeX document a \psfrag command for replacing the tag as follows.
  \psfrag{tag}[position][psposition][scale][rotation]{LaTeX construction}
- Include the EPS file into the LaTeX document using \includegraphics.
- Load psfrag.sty using \usepackage.

== Pdf compatibility ==
PSfrag is not pdf-compatible, but there exist external solutions, like pstool, pst-pdf or pdfrack.
