= Box Backup =

Online backup system

- Stable release: 0.12.master.200326.8e8b63c / March 26, 2020; 6 years ago
- Written in: C++
- Operating system: Cross-platform
- Available in: English
- Type: Backup software
- License: mixed BSD/GPL license
- Website: www.boxbackup.org
- Repository: github.com/boxbackup/boxbackup

Box Backup is an open-source, completely automatic online backup system. The client software sends the backup data to the server. The data is encrypted using the Secure Sockets Layer (SSL) protocol and is also protected by a further layer of on-disk encryption.

Box Backup supports Linux, UNIX, Windows, and Mac OS X backup clients and servers (although Windows servers are not recommended by the authors).

Box Backup is licensed under the GNU GPL and BSD licenses.

== Introduction ==
Box Backup is a client-server application in which a client sends data to the server for storage. The server provides management of client via certificates, storage quotas, and data retention. It allows clients with low-bandwidth connections to perform reliable backups.

Box Backup is ideal for backing up laptops and computers with intermittent or low-bandwidth connections, because it is capable of continuous data protection in the background, starting automatically when an internet connection is present, and recovering gracefully and efficiently from connection failures.

Box Backup uses a modified version of the Rsync algorithm, that works with encrypted blocks. This allows it to store data on the server in a form that the server operator cannot read, while still uploading only changed portions of data files.

Due to the approach of backing up only the changed blocks of files, the restore operation can also restore old versions of a file by recombining it from older blocks.
