= Skysite =

Document management platform

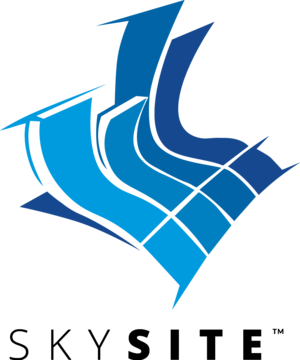
- Company type: Privately held company
- Founded: 2015; 11 years ago
- Headquarters: California, United States
- Key people: Suri Suriyakumar – chairman, president and chief executive officer, Rahul Roy – chief technology officer, Jorge Avalos – chief financial officer, Dilo Wijesuriya – chief operating officer
- Website: www.skysite.com

Skysite (stylized as SKYSITE) is a cloud-based document management platform used in construction and facility management. It provides tools for organizing and sharing project and building-related documents.

== History ==
Skysite was founded in 2015 with the goal of helping manage documents in active construction projects. Skysite offers users desktop sync and a mobile app that has been designed to add mobility to the industry.

== Product ==
The software allows users to manage, view, collaborate, and distribute encrypted construction documents in real time on mobile device or desktop device. The app has been designed to store all critical information in the cloud, for local or offline access. It also has built-in mark-up tools to communicate issues. The offerings of the app includes improved hyperlinking of construction documents, image and more attachments to a Punch list item and document search. Users can upload documents and files with drag and drop, pictures can be pinned to construction drawings and RFIs can be answered. A sample project aids users in getting started.

Facility management professionals can manage, sync, organize, search and share important information from computers and mobile devices. Skysite allows to sync all documents with mark-ups, and annotations, along with revision updates, so that the team can uses the right information to make decisions. The revamped application program interface (API) of Skysite is designed to fit to an existing information technology infrastructure and integrate with other project applications. Skysite’s API integrates with various productivity tools including Google Drive Box, Dropbox, OneDrive, and Egnyte.

Skysite software can be accessed to reduce errors and inadequacies associated with paper-based document management systems during all the phases of construction. The system is designed to reduce information management costs, increase work efficiency, enable secure file access and sharing, and make collaboration better, easier, and faster. The Skysite mobile app is available on the iOS App Store and Google Play Store.
