= Atera Networks =

IT management software

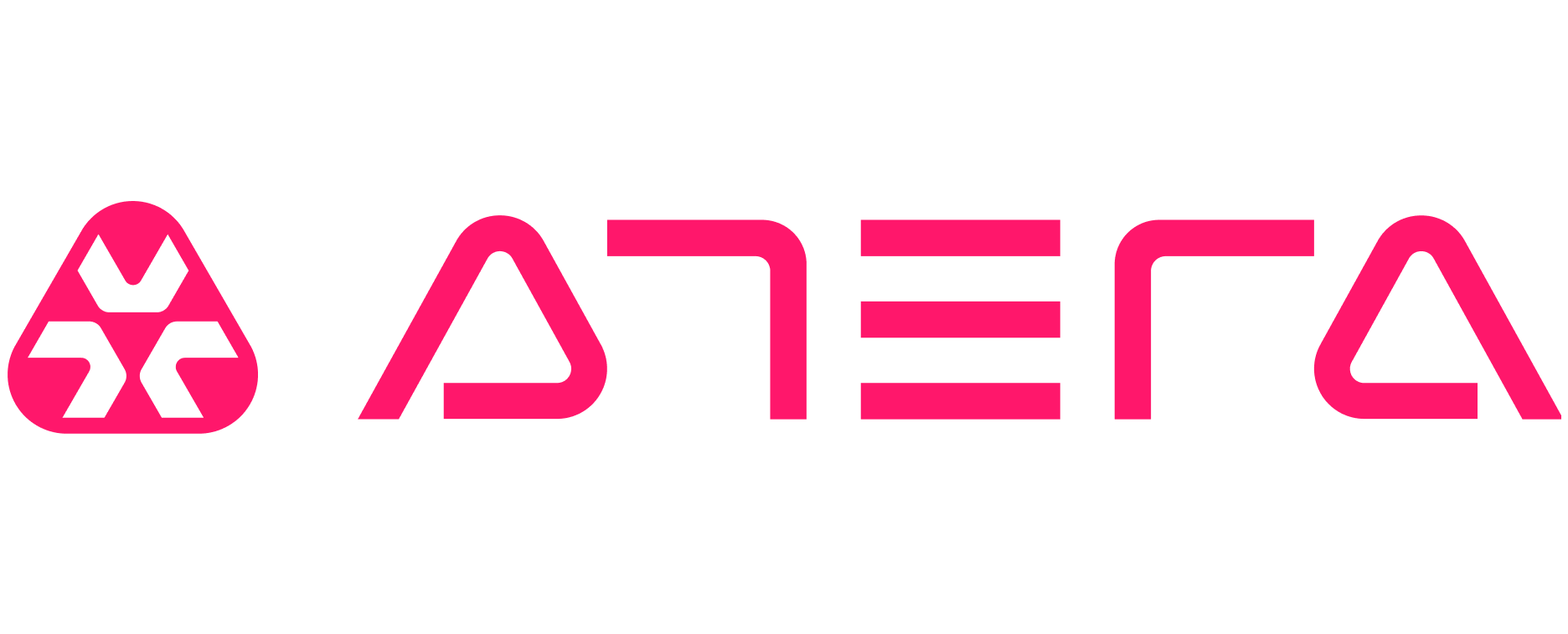
- Type: Private
- Industry: Information technology
- Founded: 2011; 15 years ago
- Founder: Gil Pekelman; Oshri Moyal
- Headquarters: Tel Aviv, Israel
- Key people: Gil Pekelman (CEO); Oshri Moyal (CTO); Avi Israel (CFO); Tal Dagan (CPO); Nir Elharar (CMO); Emanuel Kanievsky (CRO); Shani Brounshtein (CHRO); Sharon Peer (EVP IT & Security)
- Products: Remote monitoring and management System monitoring Patch management Network monitoring AI
- Website: www.atera.com

Atera Networks (also known simply as Atera) is a Tel-Aviv based autonomous IT management platform with built-in AI agents that offers functionalities such as remote monitoring and management (RMM), ticketing system, help desk, patch management, and operational automation alongside operational aspects like reporting and analytics.

Targeted towards information technology (IT) departments and managed service providers (MSPs), Atera facilitates file transfers, remote computer access, multi-user support, and the creation of automation without limitations on device or server counts, and autonomous resolution. It aims to shift IT professionals from a reactive to a proactive work model. The company maintains offices in Israel, the United States of America, Romania, and the Netherlands.

== Company ==
The company was founded in 2011 by Gil Pekelman and Oshri Moyal in Israel. The Tel Aviv-based startup focuses on developing predictive IT management software for organizations, incorporating artificial intelligence (AI) for system malfunction prediction and management. The platform, offered as a software as a service (SaaS), enables remote access, billing, and reporting capabilities.

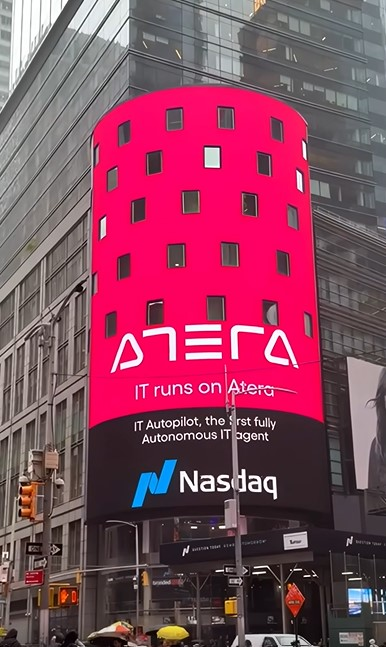
Atera featured on the Nasdaq MarketSite digital billboard in Times Square, New York City, in June 2025, introducing its IT Autopilot product

After a decade of operation without external funding, Atera raised $100 million in two funding rounds. The company became profitable in 2017, and although it intentionally reduced its profitability in 2019 to invest in growth, it remained bootstrapped until its first investment round in 2020, led by K1, with a $25 million investment. In 2021, a Series B funding round led by General Atlantic, with K1 also participating, brought in $77 million, valuing Atera at $500 million. The funding was aimed to enhance customer reach, expand product capabilities, particularly in AI for predictive analytics, and support further global expansion and product innovation.

== Software ==
The software architecture begins with endpoint-installed clients connecting to a network, allowing IT managers to monitor networks as if localized. Atera collects data points from devices, focusing on hardware performance, networking, software performance, and security diagnostics, predicting potential issues. In January 2023, Atera integrated OpenAI Codex into its RMM platform for automated script generation, aiming to reduce manual scripting time for IT professionals. This integration was part of Atera's strategy to utilize AI and machine learning for automation and failure prediction, enhancing the platform's overall efficiency. A further expansion with OpenAI in April 2023 introduced a feature for automating remediation processes based on support ticket inputs.

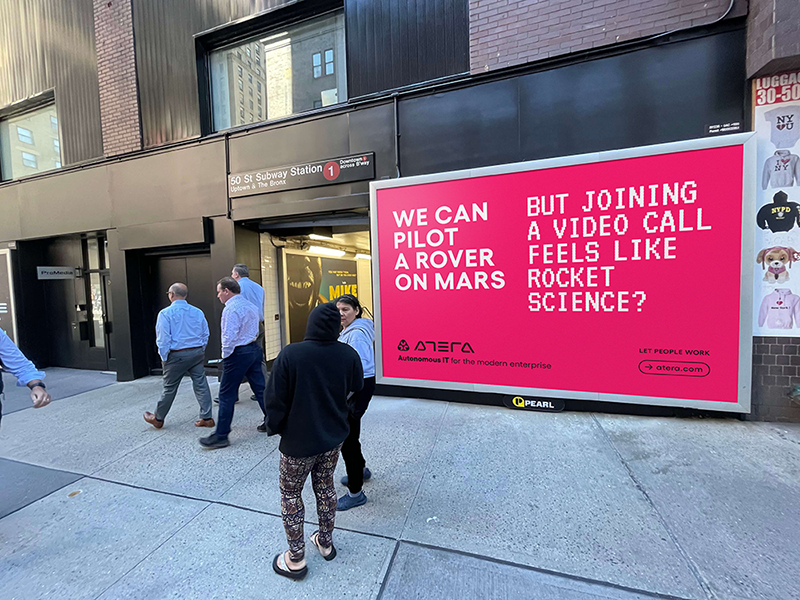
Atera’s “Let people work” billboard at the 50th Street station entrance in New York City, March 2026, marking the debut of Robin by Atera.

The company has integrated its IT platform with Microsoft's Azure OpenAI Service, which contributes to a comprehensive monitoring of IT operations. Atera’s AI Copilot, released in 2024, is an AI agent purpose-built to support technicians in their daily work. Atera's IT Autopilot, released in May 2025 is an AI agent that autonomously resolves low-risk IT tasks, enabling end users to self-troubleshoot repetitive issues such as password resets and reboots. Built into Atera’s platform, thereby minimizing the need for IT intervention. This function aims to substantially reduce initial response times and amplify the productivity of IT teams.

In March 2026, Atera rebranded IT Autopilot as Robin by Atera to reflect its expanding, enterprise-focused capabilities to autonomously resolve complex technical issues, on device, network or in the cloud.

Atera integrates third-party security software for enhanced protection and issues security patches. The platform's functionality includes a browser-based management console for system monitoring, service ticket creation for IT issues, customizable alerts, endpoint management, real-time diagnostics, patch management, and extensive reporting capabilities, offering insights into IT service performance and technician efficiency.
