= Amanda (software) =

Open source software

- Developers: University of Maryland, College Park; Zmanda
- Stable release: 3.5.4 / 25 August 2023
- Written in: C; Perl
- Operating system: Linux; Oracle Solaris; Windows; macOS
- Type: Tape backup software
- License: BSD License; GPLv2; LGPL; Apache; UMD License
- Website: amanda.org
- Repository: github.com/zmanda/amanda

The Advanced Maryland Automatic Network Disk Archiver (Amanda) is an open source computer archiving tool that is able to back up data residing on multiple computers on a network. It uses a client–server model, where the server contacts each client to perform a backup at a scheduled time.

Amanda was initially developed at the University of Maryland and is released under a BSD-style license. Amanda is available both as a free community edition and fully supported enterprise edition. Amanda runs on almost any Unix or Unix-like systems. Amanda supports Windows systems using Samba or a native Win32 client with support for open files.

Amanda supports both tape-based and disk-based backup, and provides some useful functionality not available in other backup products. Amanda supports tape-spanning i.e. if a backup set does not fit in one tape, it will be split into multiple tapes.

== See also ==
- Bacula
- Proxmox Backup Server
