= Baltic University Programme =

The Baltic University Programme (BUP) is one of the largest university cooperations in the world with 116 participating universities (as of April 2025) in the Baltic Sea Region. It has its Coordinating Secretariat at Uppsala University, in Sweden. The Programme has strived since its foundation in 1991 to find novel ways of interaction among universities by promoting openness, internationalisation and mobility. The main aim is to support building strong regional educational and research communities. The focus of the programme is Sustainable development, Environmental protection and Democracy.

The participating universities are located in countries that fully or partly lay within the Drainage basin area of the Baltic Sea and include the countries of Czechia, Estonia, Finland, Germany, Latvia, Lithuania, Poland, Slovakia, Sweden and Ukraine. In each country, a National Centre provides the local contacts within the Programme, the National Centres are also responsible for content and arrangement of the BUP events in a half-year rotation Presidency within the Programme. Some of the activities that are arranged are: student conferences, PhD students trainings, university teacher's trainings, summer schools, research conferences and different online activities.

Much of the Programme's work is centralised around the 10 themes.

1. Circular economy
2. Climate change
3. Education for sustainable development
4. Energy Systems (previously Renewable energy)
5. Sustainable food system
6. Sustainable mobility
7. Sustainable societies
8. Sustainable tourism
9. Sustainable Water resources
10. Urban-Rural development

== BUP Logotype and BUP history ==
During 2018 an update to the BUP logotype was made. This was done to better explain the BUP history and future aim. The logotype shows a satellite in the middle, reflecting on the innovative way of teaching and networking. In the 1990s the BUP set up satellite TV arrangements, which was very novel at the time.

The use of satellite TV allowed for a much broader participation and student involvement. The first satellite TV broadcast was staged in October 1991. It had documentaries from many of the countries in the Baltic Sea Region and with several researcher present in the broadcast. In the following year, several such broadcasts were performed enabling discussions between universities in the network. After a few years, the broadcast were made not only from Sweden and Uppsala but from all countries around the Baltic Sea, from Visby, Åbo/Turku, and St Petersburg, to Gdansk and Berlin, and there were as well space bridges. By the late 1990s, the internet had been developed and started to replace Satellite TV. Discussion between student groups were made using this new channel for interaction instead.

The history of involving people that were far apart from each other, is something the BUP have chosen to honour in the logotype. The satellite in the middle is a reflection of connecting and enlightening the people in the Baltic Sea Region.

In February 2022, the BUP stopped all collaboration with universities in Russia and Belarus as a consequence of Russia's full-scale invasion of Ukraine.

== Organizational structure ==
The Programme is governed by an international board and coordinated by the coordinating secretariat at Uppsala University, Sweden. The programme also has three associate secretariats located at Åbo Akademi University in Finland, Lodz University of Technology in Poland and Hamburg University of Applied Sciences in Germany.

Secretariats
Country	University	Secretariat type
Sweden	Uppsala University	Coordinating Secretariat
Finland	Åbo Akademi University	Associated Secretariat
Poland	Lodz University of Technology	Associated Secretariat
Germany	Hamburg University of Applied Sciences	Associated Secreteriat

National centres and participating universities
Country	National Centre	Number of participating universities as of April 2025
Czechia	University of Ostrava	4
Estonia	Tallinn University	4
Finland	Åbo Akademi University	8
Germany	Hamburg University of Applied Sciences	9
Latvia	Riga Technical University	5
Lithuania	Klaipeda University	8
Poland	Lodz University of Technology	34
Slovakia	University of Ss. Cyril and Methodius in Trnava	4
Sweden	Södertörn University	11
Ukraine	Lviv Polytechnic National University	29
Total		116
