= LuckyBackup =

luckyBackup
- Developer: Loukas Avgeriou
- Stable release: 0.5.0 / 18 November 2018; 7 years ago
- Written in: C++
- Operating system: Linux, Unix, Mac OS X, Windows
- Type: Backup
- License: GPL 3
- Website: luckybackup.sourceforge.net

luckyBackup is a free backup application for Linux. It provides a GUI based on the cross-platform Qt framework and is not fundamentally console based or web based as many of the clients from the list of backup software are. The GUI is translated in many languages and is available in repositories of all major Linux distributions including Debian, Ubuntu, openSUSE, Fedora, Mandriva, Slackware and Gentoo.

The latest version was released in November 2018 and while development is "almost frozen", the program is still supported.

== Awards - Distinctions ==
- 3 August 2009: 3rd place at the SourceForge Community Choice Awards as a "best new project"
- 2008–2010: Highest rated application at kde-apps.org
