= Areca Backup =

File backup system

- Developer: Olivier Petrucci
- Stable release: 7.5 / August 26, 2015; 10 years ago
- Repository: sourceforge.net/projects/areca/
- Written in: Java
- Operating system: All operating systems, provided that a Java Runtime Environment has been installed; packaged for Linux and Windows
- Type: Utility
- License: GPL v2.0
- Website: www.areca-backup.org

Areca Backup was an Open Source personal file backup software developed in Java. It was released under the GNU General Public License (GPL) 2.

== Features ==
Areca Backup included a backup engine, as well as a graphical user interface and a command-line interface.

The application included the following features:

- ZIP/ZIP64 compression
- AES 128 & AES 256 encryption
- Backup filters (by extension, subdirectory, regular expression, size, date, status, usage)
- Incremental backup, differential and full backup support
- Delta backup (only the modified parts of the files will be stored, not the whole files)
- Archives merges
- As of date recovery
- Transaction mechanism (with commit/rollback management) for all critical processes (such as backups or merges) to guarantee backups' integrity
- Unix file permissions backup/recovery
- E-Mail reports
- Backup simulation
- FTP and FTPS support (SSL/TLS in both implicit and explicit modes)
- SFTP support (with password or certificate authentication)

Areca also provided all tools needed to handle your archives:

- Backup
- Archive recovery (with or without deleted files); entire archives or single files can be easily recovered
- Archive merge: contiguous incremental archives can be merged into a single archive to save storage space
- Archive deletion
- History explorer: different versions of a given file can be browsed and restored
- Archive explorer: files can be searched among your archives

Storage modes Areca could handle multiple storage modes:

- Standard: It is the default mode, which is recommended for most users: If you choose this storage mode, a new archive will be created for each backup. All new or modified files since the last backup will be stored in this archive.
- Delta: This mode is recommended for advanced users only: If you choose this storage mode, a new archive will be created for each backup. All modified *parts* of files since the last backup will be stored in this archive. This mode is particularly useful if you are handling large files.
- Image: If you choose this storage mode, a unique archive will be created and updated at each backup.

Backup types Areca could handle the following types of backups:

- Full Backup: When a full backup is performed, ALL files are stored in your archive (whether they have been modified or not).
- Incremental backup: When an incremental backup is performed, only the files which have been modified since the last backup are stored in your archive.
- Differential backup: When a differential backup is performed, only the files which have been modified since the last FULL backup are stored in your archive.

Areca used the file's size and last modification time to detect modified files. If one of these attributes is modified (whatever its value is), the file is flagged as modified. This allows a fast detection of modified files.

Areca was downloadable pre-packaged for Linux and Windows 2000/Windows XP and Windows Vista. But it also ran on any other operating system, provided that a Java Runtime Environment has been installed (version 1.4.2 or later). It was translated to: Chinese (Simplified), Chinese (Traditional), Czech, Danish, Dutch, English, French, German, Hungarian, Italian, Japanese, Russian, Spanish, Swedish.

== Limitations ==
- Areca Backup did not have a built in method of handling automated backup creation for Windows-based operating systems. The user is required to configure a backup strategy using an included Wizard, which consequently creates a collection of bat files required to be manually added to the Windows Task Scheduler.
- Areca Backup did not support VSS (Volume Shadow Copy Service) and cannot backup files that are locked by other programs, but there are plugins for Areca that do (like ArecaVSS)
