= Dump (Unix) =

dump
- Developer: AT&T Bell Laboratories
- Initial release: November 1973; 52 years ago
- Operating system: Unix and Unix-like, MSX-DOS
- Type: Command

The dump command is a program on Unix and Unix-like operating systems used to back up file systems. It operates on blocks, below filesystem abstractions such as files and directories. Dump can back up a file system to a tape or another disk. It is often used across a network by piping its output through bzip2 then SSH.

A dump utility first appeared in Version 6 AT&T UNIX. A dump command is also part of ASCII's MSX-DOS2 Tools for MSX-DOS version 2.

== Usage ==
dump [-0123456789acLnSu] [-B records] [-b blocksize] [-C cachesize]
[-D dumpdates] [-d density] [-f file | -P pipecommand] [-h level]
[-s feet] [-T date] filesystem

$ dump -W | -w

== See also ==
- tar (file format)
- cpio
- rsync
