= Back in Time (Linux software) =

Computer backup program for Linux

Back In Time
- Original authors: Oprea Dan, Bart de Koning, Richard Bailey, Germar Reitze, Taylor Raack
- Developers: Michael Büker, Christian Buhtz & Team
- Release: 2008; 18 years ago
- Stable release: 1.6.1 / 10 February 2026; 5 months ago
- Written in: Python, Qt (GUI)
- Operating system: Linux
- Available in: 47 languages
- Type: Backup software
- License: GPL-2.0-or-later
- Website: github.com/bit-team/backintime
- Repository: github.com/bit-team/backintime

Back In Time is a backup application for Linux with a graphical interface written in Qt and a command line interface. It is available directly from the repositories of many Linux distributions. Released under the terms of the GNU General Public License (GPL), it is free software.

Back In Time uses rsync as backend and has the characteristic feature of using hard links for files which are identical in backups at different times, thus using disk space just once for files that remained unchanged. It is possible to use several backup profiles, e.g. for backups on different hard disks and also to create schedules. Symbolic links can be backed up, both absolute and relative ones, but hard links cannot be treated as such due to the used backup method. Back In Time also supports encryption of backups and backup over SSH.

Advantages of the hard link method are that it is easy to look at snapshots of the system at different times and also easy to remove old snapshots compared to incremental backup methods which save difference information between consecutive backup times. However, a drawback of Back In Time is that it does not allow for compression, and requires file systems that support hard links on the backup location.
