= Rsync =

File synchronization protocol and software

rsync
- Original authors: Andrew Tridgell, Paul Mackerras
- Developer: Andrew Tridgell
- Release: June 19, 1996; 30 years ago
- Stable release: 3.5.2 / 4 November 2026; 6 days ago
- Written in: C
- Platform: Cross-platform
- Type: Data transfer, differential backup
- License: 2007: GPL-3.0-or-later (Note: GPL-3.0-or-later since 2007-07-10, pre-release 3.0.0pre1 on 2007-10-05, stable 3.0.0 on 2008-03-01.); 2007: GPL-3.0-only (Note: GPL-3.0-only from 2007-07-07 until 2007-07-09.); 2007: GPL-2.0-only (Note: GPL-2.0-only from 2007-02-04 until 2007-07-07.); 1996: GPL-2.0-or-later (Note: GPL-2.0-or-later from 1996-06-16 until 2007-01-31, versions 0.1 to 2.6.9.)
- Website: rsync.samba.org
- Repository: github.com/RsyncProject/rsync

rsync (remote sync) is a utility for transferring and synchronizing files between a computer and a storage drive and across networked computers by comparing the modification times and sizes of files.

The rsync algorithm is a type of delta encoding, and is used for minimizing network usage. Zlib, Zstd, and LZ4 may be used for additional data compression.

One application of rsync is the synchronization of software repositories on mirror sites used by package management systems.

== History ==
Andrew Tridgell and Paul Mackerras wrote the original rsync, which was first announced on 19 June 1996. It is similar in function and invocation to rdist (rdist -c), created by Ralph Campbell in 1983 and released as part of 4.3BSD. Tridgell discusses the design, implementation, and performance of rsync in chapters 3 through 5 of his 1999 Ph.D. thesis. Wayne Davison became the primary maintainer in 2002. In April 2024, Davison announced that Andrew Tridgell, known online as "tridge", had returned to active development and maintenance of rsync after Davison requested assistance due to limited available time. Since then, rsync has been maintained under the RsyncProject organization, with Tridgell serving as the project's maintainer.

It has been ported to Windows (via Cygwin, Grsync, or SFU), FreeBSD, NetBSD, OpenBSD, and macOS.

== Examples ==
A command line to mirror FreeBSD might look like:

$ rsync -avz --delete ftp4.de.FreeBSD.org::FreeBSD/ /pub/FreeBSD/

The Apache HTTP Server supports rsync only for updating mirrors.

$ rsync -avz --delete --safe-links rsync.apache.org::apache-dist /path/to/mirror

The preferred (and simplest) way to mirror a PuTTY website to the current directory is to use rsync.

$ rsync -auH rsync://rsync.chiark.greenend.org.uk/ftp/users/sgtatham/putty-website-mirror/ .

A way to mimic the capabilities of Time Machine (macOS);

$ date=$(date "+%FT%H-%M-%S") # rsync interprets ":" as separator between host and port (i.e. host:port), so we cannot use %T or %H:%M:%S here, so we use %H-%M-%S
$ rsync -aP --link-dest=$HOME/Backups/current /path/to/important_files $HOME/Backups/back-$date
$ ln -nfs $HOME/Backups/back-$date $HOME/Backups/current

Make a full backup of system root directory:

$ rsync -avAXHS --progress --exclude={"/dev/*","/proc/*","/sys/*","/tmp/*","/run/*","/mnt/*","/media/*","/lost+found"} / /path/to/backup/folder

Delete all files and directories, within a directory, extremely fast:

$ rsync -a --delete /path/to/empty/dir /path/to/dir/to/empty # Make an empty directory somewhere, which is the first path, and the second path is the directory you want to empty.

== Algorithm ==
=== Determining which files to send ===
By default, rsync determines which files differ between the sending and receiving systems by checking the modification time and size of each file. If time or size is different between the systems, it transfers the file from the sending to the receiving system. As this only requires reading file directory information, it is quick, but it will miss unusual modifications which change neither.

=== Determining which parts of a file have changed ===
The recipient splits its copy of the file into chunks and computes two checksums for each chunk: the MD5 hash, and a weaker but easier to compute 'rolling checksum'. It sends these checksums to the sender.

The sender computes the checksum for each rolling section in its version of the file having the same size as the chunks used by the recipient's. While the recipient calculates the checksum only for chunks starting at full multiples of the chunk size, the sender calculates the checksum for all sections starting at any address. If any such rolling checksum calculated by the sender matches a checksum calculated by the recipient, then this section is a candidate for not transmitting the content of the section, but only the location in the recipient's file instead. In this case, the sender uses the more computationally expensive MD5 hash to verify that the sender's section and recipient's chunk are equal. Note that the section in the sender may not be at the same start address as the chunk at the recipient. This allows efficient transmission of files which differ by insertions and deletions.

== Criticism ==
When rsync was updated to 3.4.3 on May 20, 2026, several users reported being unable to perform incremental file backups. Those users found that since rsync 3.4.1, dozens of git commits have been performed by "tridge and claude," with Anthropic's Claude being used in the coding process. This led to a user to post a GitHub issue called Please Do Not Vibe Fuck Up This Software, which spread to other social media sites like Reddit, leading to debates over AI-generated code getting accepted into critical open source infrastructure.

In response, Tridge published a blog post called rsync and outrage, in which he states he used AI to add test suites and "defence-in-depth hardening techniques" to the code. Tridge also stated that OpenBSD's openrsync, an alternate implementation of rsync that some users were planning to switch to, fails the AI-assisted test suite.

== Variations ==
The rdiff utility uses the rsync algorithm to generate delta files with the difference from file A to file B (like the utility diff, but in a different delta format). The delta file can then be applied to file A, turning it into file B (similar to the patch utility). rdiff works well with binary files.

The rdiff-backup script maintains a backup mirror of a file or directory either locally or remotely over the network on another server. rdiff-backup stores incremental rdiff deltas with the backup, with which it is possible to recreate any backup point.

The librsync library used by rdiff is an independent implementation of the rsync algorithm. It does not use the rsync network protocol and does not share any code with the rsync application. It is used by Dropbox, rdiff-backup, duplicity, and other utilities.

The acrosync library is an independent, cross-platform implementation of the rsync network protocol. Unlike librsync, it is wire-compatible with rsync (protocol version 29 or 30). It is released under the Reciprocal Public License and used by the commercial rsync software Acrosync.

The duplicity backup software written in python allows for incremental backups with simple storage backend services like local file system, sftp, Amazon S3 and many others. It utilizes librsync to generate delta data against signatures of the previous file versions, encrypting them using gpg, and storing them on the backend. For performance reasons a local archive-dir is used to cache backup chain signatures, but can be re-downloaded from the backend if needed.

As of macOS 10.5 and later, there is a special -E or --extended-attributes switch which allows retaining much of the HFS+ file metadata when syncing between two machines supporting this feature. This is achieved by transmitting the Resource Fork along with the Data Fork.

The openrsync utility is a BSD licensed re-implement of the original rsync targeting OpenBSD but also portable to Linux and macOS.

zsync is an rsync-like tool optimized for many downloads per file version. zsync is used by Linux distributions such as Ubuntu for distributing fast changing beta ISO image files. zsync uses the HTTP protocol and .zsync files with pre-calculated rolling hash to minimize server load yet permit diff transfer for network optimization.

Rclone is an open-source tool inspired by rsync that focuses on cloud and other high latency storage. It supports more than 50 different providers and provides an rsync-like interface for cloud storage. However, Rclone does not support rolling checksums for partial file syncing (binary diffs) because cloud storage providers do not usually offer the feature and Rclone avoids storing additional metadata.

== rsync applications ==
Program	Operating system			Free software	Description
Program	Linux	macOS	Windows	Free software	Description
Back In Time	Yes	No	No	Yes	
BackupAssist	No	No	Yes	No	Direct mirror or with history, VSS.
cwRsync	No	No	Yes	No	Based on Cygwin.
Grsync	Yes	Yes	Yes	Yes	Graphical Interface for rsync.
LuckyBackup	Yes	Yes	Yes	Yes	
rclone	Yes	Yes	Yes	Yes	Inspired by rsync and supports more than 50 cloud storage providers and other high latency storage services. Does not actually use rsync or support rolling checksums and partial file synchronization.
tym	Yes	Yes	Yes	Yes	Time rsYnc Machine – backup à la Time Machine – Bash script
Unison	Yes	Yes	Yes	Yes	
rsnapshot	Yes	?	No	Yes	Incremental backup script using rsync and hard links to keep full snapshots locally or remotely via ssh. Space and bandwidth are preserved because only modifications are transmitted and stored. It provides a compromise between speed, size, ease of restore and redundancy.

== See also ==
- casync
- Remote Differential Compression
- List of TCP and UDP port numbers
- Grsync – App based on RSync but with graphical user interface
- Comparison of file synchronization software
