= Redo Rescue =

Backup and disaster recovery software

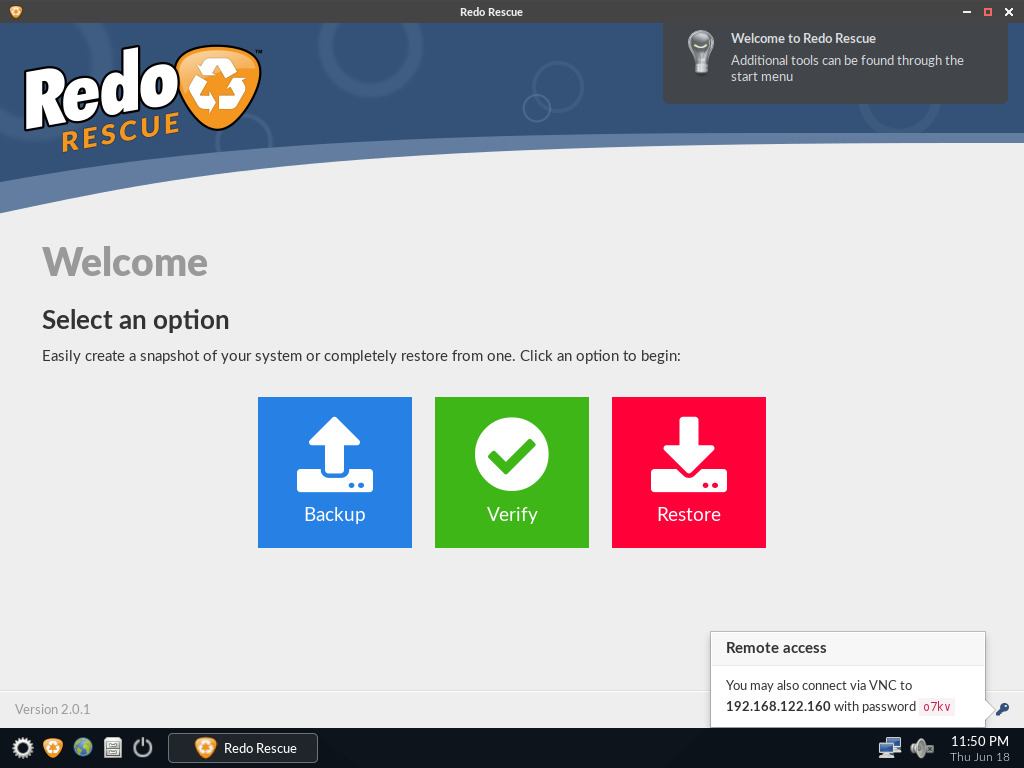
- Redo Rescue initial screen
- Developer: Zebradots Software
- Final release: 4.0.0 / October 9, 2021; 4 years ago
- Operating system: An included version of Linux (Live OS)
- Available in: English
- Type: Disaster recovery
- License: GNU General Public License
- Website: redorescue.com
- Repository: github.com/redorescue/redorescue

Redo Rescue, formerly Redo Backup and Recovery, is a free backup and disaster recovery software. It runs from a live CD, a bootable Linux CD image, features a GUI that is a front end to the Partclone command line utility, and is capable of bare-metal backup and recovery of disk partitions. It can use external hard drives and network shares.

After a long period of inactivity since 2012, the project has been resumed in 2020 adopting a shorter name: Redo Rescue.

Beginning in Nov 2024, the latest ISO version (4.0.0) of Redo Rescue, when burned onto a USB, will not boot if run on a system with Windows and Secure Boot enabled. The issue is caused by a revoked UEFI certificate in the underlying OS used by Redo Rescue. As the most recent release of Redo Rescue in Sept 2022 was listed as the Final Release, this issue will likely remain unresolved.

In addition to backup software, the disk includes additional supporting programs such as:

- baobab
- chntpw
- cryptsetup
- drivereset
- Chromium
- fsarchiver
- geany
- gnome-disk-utility
- gparted
- grsync
- hdparm
- lshw-gtk
- partclone
- partimage
- photorec
- rsync
- scp
- smartctl
- ssh
- testdisk

== Rescuezilla ==
In 2019, while the project was inactive, it was forked and many long-standing bugs were fixed, to create Rescuezilla based on Debian, later based on Ubuntu. Rescuezilla 2.5 is described as Clonezilla with a GUI.

== See also ==
- Clonezilla
- Disk cloning
- List of disk cloning software
- List of data recovery software
