= Macrium Reflect =

Backup utility for Microsoft Windows

- Developer: Paramount Software UK Ltd (trading as Macrium Software)
- Stable release: v10.0.8750 / December 3, 2025; 9 months ago
- Operating system: Windows XP SP3 or later Windows Server 2003 SP2 or later
- Available in: English, German, Spanish, French, Italian, Chinese, Dutch, Japanese, Korean, Polish, Portuguese (BR), Russian, Turkish, Ukrainian, Hungarian
- Type: Backup software
- License: paid, trialware
- Website: www.macrium.com

Macrium Reflect is a disk imaging and backup utility for Microsoft Windows developed by Paramount Software UK Ltd in 2006. It is designed for home and enterprise users, offering disk imaging, cloning, and backup.

It creates disk images and file backup archives using Windows' Volume Shadow Copy Service to ensure 'point in time' data accuracy. Macrium Reflect can back up whole partitions or individual files and folders into a single compressed, mountable archive file, which can be used to restore exact images of the partitions on the same hard disk for disaster recovery, or a new hard disk for data migration.

Macrium Reflect is known for its ease of use, speed, and robust feature set, making it a popular choice among IT professionals and home users. It has received numerous reviews, and is often recommended for cloning and backup tutorials.

== Overview ==
Macrium Reflect can create full, incremental, and differential backup images, or selectively back up individual files and folders. Data is compressed and encrypted in real time using LZ-based compression and AES encryption algorithms. Images can be mounted as a drive letter in Windows' File Explorer and restored using a custom Macrium Reflect Rescue USB. In the event of a partial or complete system loss, this image can be used to restore the entire disk, one or more partitions, or individual files and folders.

Macrium Reflect can clone one disk onto another, and restore an image to new hardware. Using pre-created Macrium Reflect Rescue media (CD, DVD, or USB memory stick), critical drivers required by the new system can be inserted into the image taken from the old system, making it compatible with the new hardware.

Macrium Reflect image backups created with any older version (Free or paid editions) can be restored with any later version.

=== Key features ===
1. Disk imaging and cloning Macrium Reflect allows users to create full, incremental, and differential disk images. This enables efficient backups of entire systems, partitions, or individual files and folders. The software also supports disk cloning, allowing users to migrate data from one drive to another seamlessly, which is useful for hardware upgrades.

2. Speed Since the launch of Macrium Reflect X in October 2024, the software uses z-standard compression and optimized multithreading processes to double the speed of backup and recovery. In addition, Rapid Delta Restore (RDR) technology reduces restore times by restoring only the differences between disk images. This makes system recovery faster than traditional restore methods.

3. Bootable rescue media Macrium Reflect includes tools for creating bootable rescue media on USB drives, CDs, or DVDs. This ensures users can recover their systems even if the primary operating system is unbootable. The rescue media includes a pre-installed version of Macrium Reflect, allowing users to restore backups or fix boot issues.

4. Scheduled backups The software supports flexible scheduling options, enabling users to automate backup processes according to their needs. Macrium Reflect integrates with the Windows Task Scheduler for seamless automation.

5. Support for Copilot+ARM devices With the launch of Reflect X, the company claims it is the first solution to natively support Copilot + ARM devices with bare-metal restore and boot menu recovery options, something which other backup software could not do. In addition to disk imaging, Macrium Reflect offers file and folder-level backups, providing users with the ability to protect specific data while conserving storage space.

=== Free and trial editions ===
An unsupported free edition was available for home and commercial use. It lacked some features of the full versions, such as incremental backup (though it included differential backup), but still had some features found only in expensive commercial products. The free edition was retired and received security patches until 1 January 2024.

A free trial version replaced the free version, which has virtually all of the same features as the paid-for version for 30 days, after which the software will revert to restore-only mode (where a user can only restore existing backups but not make any new backups).

=== Releases ===
- 2024-10-09 Macrium Reflect X
- 2023-01-30 Macrium Reflect 8.1 (build 8.1.7280)
- 2021-05-17 Macrium Reflect 8.0 (build 8.0.5903)
- 2021-11-18 Macrium Reflect 7.3 (build 7.3.6391)
- 2020-10-14 Macrium Reflect 7.3 (build 7.3.5281)
- 2017-09-29 Macrium Reflect 7.2 (build 7.2.3811)
- 2017-09-28 Macrium Reflect 7.1 (build 7.1.2602)
- 2017-02-27 Macrium Reflect 7.0 (build 7.0.1994)
- 2015-02-16 Macrium Reflect 6.0
- 2011-06-01 Macrium Reflect 5.0

See Macrium Product Support Policy for Support Status of Macrium Reflect.

== Macrium SiteManager Platform ==
Macrium SiteManager Platform is distinct from Macrium Reflect, though based on the same principles. Macrium Reflect is designed for standalone use and better suits home users and business users where it is necessary to manage backups on an individual workstation. Macrium SiteManager Platform offers a centralised console for backup and deployment.

=== SiteBackup ===
As of November 2024, SiteManager Platform has two components. SiteBackup for centralised backups with networked workstations and servers enables scheduling, backups, and restoring on devices running the SiteBackup agent, and is managed using a Web browser user interface.

=== SiteDeploy ===
The second component of the SiteManager platform is SiteDeploy, which offers centralised deployment of Windows OS images to remotely accessed computers and servers. One key aspect of SiteDeploy is its ability to deploy an image to dissimilar hardware from the reference machine. It significantly reduces complexity and automates complex tasks, like connecting from boot media and automating post-deployment first-time configuration.

== See also ==
- Backup and Restore (Windows 7 and Vista)
- Backup
- Comparison of disk cloning software
- Disk image
- List of backup software
