= Drive Image (software) =

Disk cloning and backup tool

- Release: September 1997; 28 years ago
- Operating system: MS-DOS, Windows
- Platform: x86

Drive Image (PQDI) is a software disk cloning package for x86-based computers. The software was developed and distributed by the former PowerQuest Corporation, beginning in 1997. It runs under MS-DOS and Windows.

Drive Image version 7 became the basis for Norton Ghost 9.0, which was released in August 2004.

== Overview ==
Drive Image 1.0 was released in September 1997.

Drive Image 2002 (version 6) is the last release that allows the creation of a rescue set on floppy disk, which can be used to create and restore an image.

Drive Image version 7 was the last version published under the PowerQuest corporate brand. It was also the first version to include a native Windows interface for cloning an active system partition; prior versions required a reboot into an MS-DOS-like environment in order to clone the active partition. In order to clone active partitions without requiring a reboot, Drive Image 7 employed a volume snapshot device driver which was licensed from StorageCraft Technology Corporation.

Drive Image version 7 became the basis for Norton Ghost 9.0, which was released to retail markets in August 2004. Ghost was a competing product, developed by Binary Research, before Symantec bought the company in 1998.

== See also ==
- List of disk cloning software
