= Clonezilla =

Drive cloning software

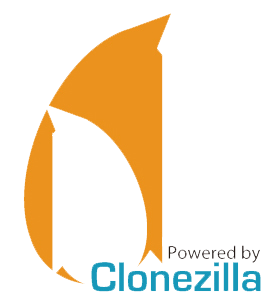
- Original author: Steven Shiau
- Developer: NCHC Free Software Labs
- Initial release: 8 September 2007
- Stable release: 5.13.15 / 18 December 2025; 58 days ago
- Preview release: 3.1.1-1 / May 7, 2023; 2 years ago
- Written in: Perl, Unix shell
- Operating system: POSIX, Linux
- Available in: English, Spanish, French, Italian, Japanese, Chinese (Simplified), Chinese (Traditional)
- Type: Disk cloning, disk imaging, system deployment
- License: GPL
- Website: www.clonezilla.org
- Repository: github.com/stevenshiau/clonezilla

Clonezilla is an open-source suite of disk cloning, disk imaging and system deployment utilities. Clonezilla Server Edition uses multicast technologies to deploy a single image file to a group of computers on a local area network. Clonezilla was designed by Steven Shiau and developed by the NCHC Free Software Labs in Taiwan.

Clonezilla is used to deploy operating systems to computers by imaging a single computer and then deploying that image to one or more systems. It integrates several other open-source programs to provide cloning and imaging capabilities.

Clonezilla works by copying used blocks on the storage device (i.e. SATA SSD, HDD or NVMe SSD). It is intended to support a bare-metal deployment of an operating system by booting from a preinstalled live environment. The preinstallation environment can be booted from a USB flash drive, CD/DVD-ROM or Android mobile phone. It uses Partclone, Ntfsclone, Partimage, or dd to image the drive either over the network or to a locally-attached hard disk drive.

== Features ==
=== Block-level copying ===
Clonezilla can operate on block-level (sector by sector). Thus, its operation could be file system-agnostic. In other words, it can clone one disk to another without knowing what partitions or file systems the source disk has. This indiscriminate approach, however, is inefficient because it would mean copying every block, even if it does not contain meaningful data. Therefore, Clonezilla uses a smart file system-aware approach. It uses information from the file system to determine which blocks on a drive require copying. This ensures that only the space currently in use on the drive is copied while empty space is ignored. Clonezilla supports Ext2, Ext3, Ext4, ReiserFS, XFS, JFS, Btrfs, NTFS, FAT, exFAT and more. For unsupported file systems, Clonezilla falls back to indiscriminate block-level copying.

By default, clonezilla uses Partclone but may fall back to Ntfsclone, Partimage, and dd where appropriate. The app also supports LVM2 and some hardware RAID chip sets.

=== Compression ===
Clonezilla uses the ZIP compression by default but can use other schemes such as gzip, LZMA or bzip2. Drive images can be split into smaller files and compressed to save space on the destination drive.

=== Encryption ===
Clonezilla supports creating password-protected images. In addition, it can mount BitLocker-encrypted volumes.

=== PXE booting ===
Clonezilla can be booted over a computer network using PXE booting techniques.

== Variants ==
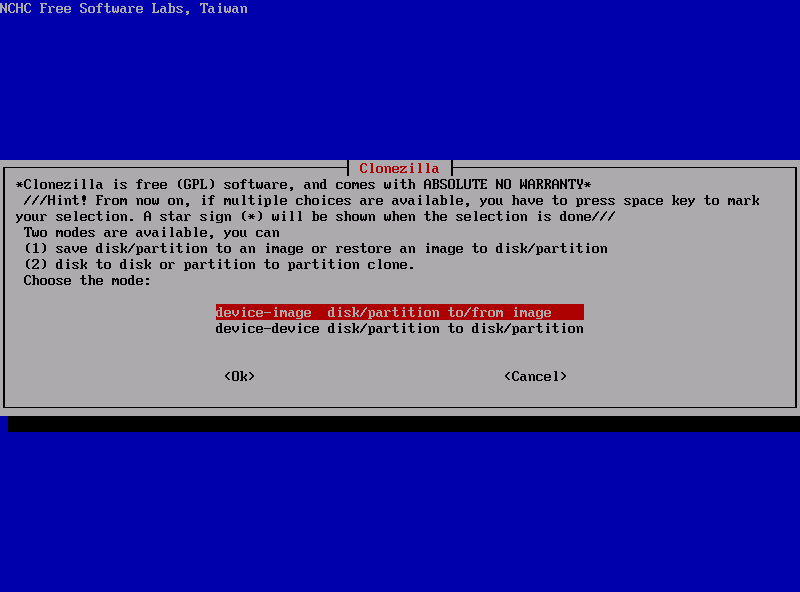
Selecting between clone and image mode

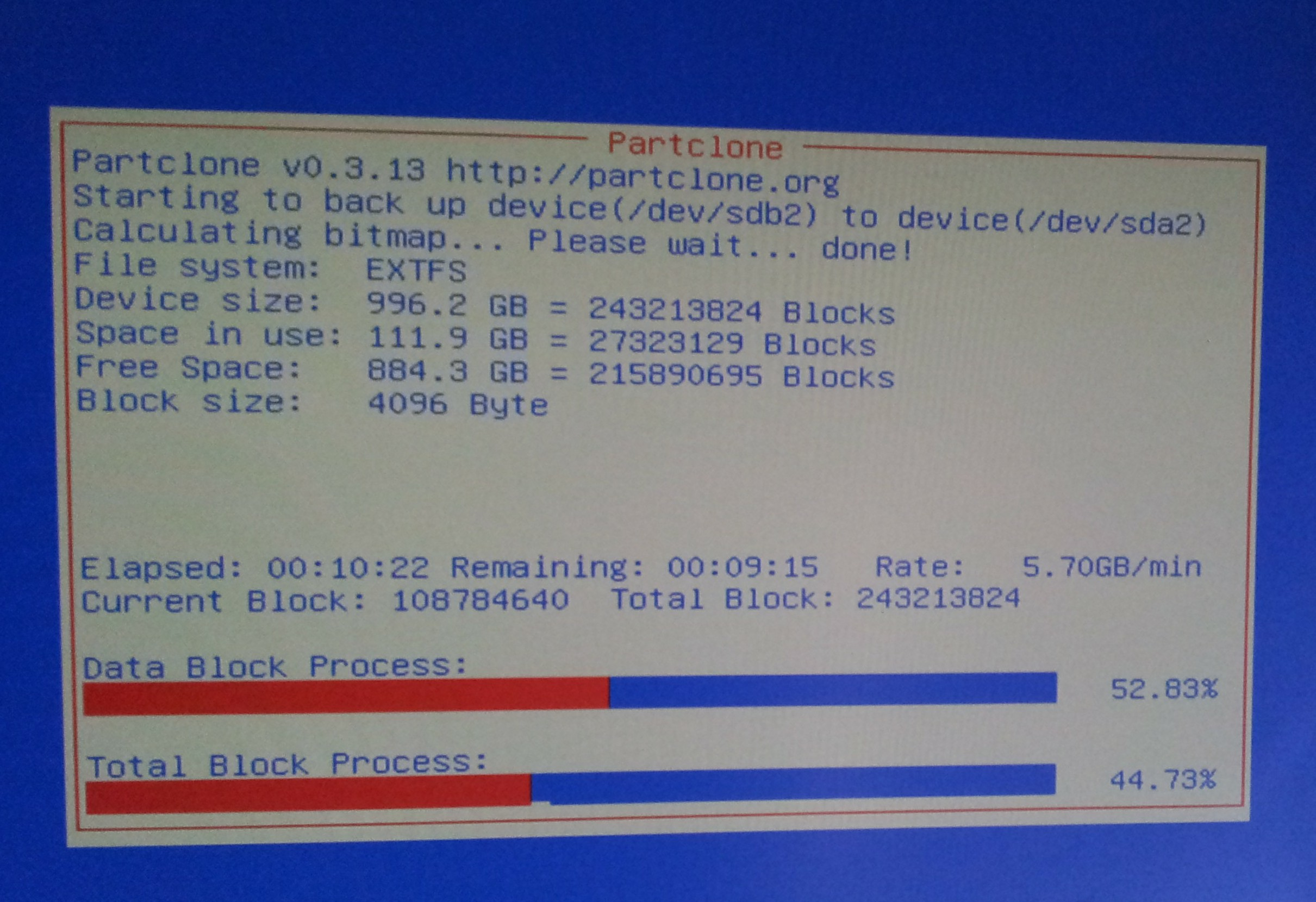
Cloning from disk to disk

There are two variants of Clonezilla: Clonezilla Live is intended to be used for imaging a single computer, while Clonezilla Server Edition (SE) is intended for mass deployment over a computer network.

=== Clonezilla Live ===
Clonezilla Live can image a single computer's storage media or a single partition on the media to an image file stored on a SSH server, Samba network share, locally-attached hard disk drive or to a network filesystem file-share. Alternatively, Clonezilla Live can clone the data on one storage medium to another without the need to create an image file first. Image files can be deployed to the same or different computers as required.

Unlike Acronis Cyber Protect Home Office and Norton Ghost, Clonezilla lacks an agent that can be installed into the operating system. Instead, Clonezilla was designed under the assumption that the disk should be cloned without interfering with the operating system. It is booted from a preinstallation environment and operations are performed within a consistent environment.

=== Clonezilla Server Edition (SE) ===
Clonezilla Server Edition (SE) can clone many computers at the same time using multicast technology over a computer network. Multicast support is provided by UDPCast tool.

Since such an environment is difficult to configure, users can download a Live disk that provides the operating system with all the necessary configurations already done. Images are uploaded to an image repository configured by the user, which may be a local directory on the same server as Clonezilla SE or a remote location such as a network-attached storage that is accessed using SSH or Samba.

== Effectiveness and limitations ==
Clonezilla is an effective tool for deploying software in training laboratories. Clonezilla can sometimes be faster than Acronis Cyber Protect Home Office and Norton Ghost for both imaging and restoration but can be difficult to configure. Clonezilla, however, is not a backup or disaster recovery solution because it does not offer incremental and differential snapshots, scheduling, or interruption-free operation. Some cloning packages allow selected files or directories to be easily extracted from a cloned image; Clonezilla does not.

== See also ==
- Partclone
- Ntfsprogs / Ntfsclone
- Partimage
- FSArchiver
- Redo Rescue
- Rescuezilla is an open-source disk imaging app with a graphical user interface that is fully compatible with Clonezilla.
