= Kleo Bare Metal Backup =

Kleo Bare Metal Backup for Servers
- Original author(s): Carroll-Net, Inc.
- Initial release: January 18, 2010
- Stable release: v2.0.3.1 / February 17, 2010; 15 years ago
- Operating system: Independent (Live CD)
- Size: 570 MB
- Available in: English
- Type: Bare-metal restore
- License: Freeware
- Website: www.kleobackup.net

Kleo Bare Metal Backup for Servers is a free file system cloning program created by Carroll-Net Inc. Kleo creates an all-inclusive backup of the operating system, device drivers and applications. Kleo is bundled with a LiveCD which includes tools for server recovery.

== Operation ==
Kleo is a graphical wizard file system cloning system. It is designed as a disaster-recovery tool, producing complete file system images. In the event a server experiences a hard drive failure, the LiveCD can be booted, and the previous backup image can be used to recover the server to the point in time of the last backup.

Kleo backups are file system aware backups. Unused blocks and empty space are not included which reduces the size of the backup image. The backup images are also passed through gzip to further compress their size. But even with compression, backup images can be quite large. For this reason, they are not suitable replacements for daily backups and are typically only done whenever significant changes are made to a server's application set or prior to applying service patches and hotfixes.

== Supported storage media ==
- Hard drive
- USB/Firewire drive
- CIFS Windows network share
- SSH server
- NFS server

== Supported file systems ==
| File system | Description |
|---|---|
| NTFS | Windows new technology file system |
| FAT16 | 16-Bit DOS file allocation table |
| FAT32 | 32-Bit Win95 file allocation table |
| Ext2 | Linux 2nd extended file system |
| Ext3 | Linux 3rd extended file system |
| Reiserfs | Linux Reiser journaled file system |
| HPFS | OS/2 High performance file system |
| JFS | IBM 64-bit journaled file system |
| XFS | Silicon Graphics journaled file system |
| UFS | BSD Fast File System |
| HFS | Apple Hierarchical File System is NOT supported in v2.0.3.18713 |

=== Known limitations ===
- Kleo does NOT support Ext4 which is the default on new Ubuntu installations
- The destination partition must be the same or larger than the source partition (limitation of the underlying partimage tool)

== File format ==
The file format written is a gzipped partimage file. The file extension is .KB2 The backup image is broken into 2 GB chunks to make it possible to store the backups on DVD.

== See also ==
- Disk cloning
- List of disk cloning software
