= Recovery disc =

Media intended to restore the operating system

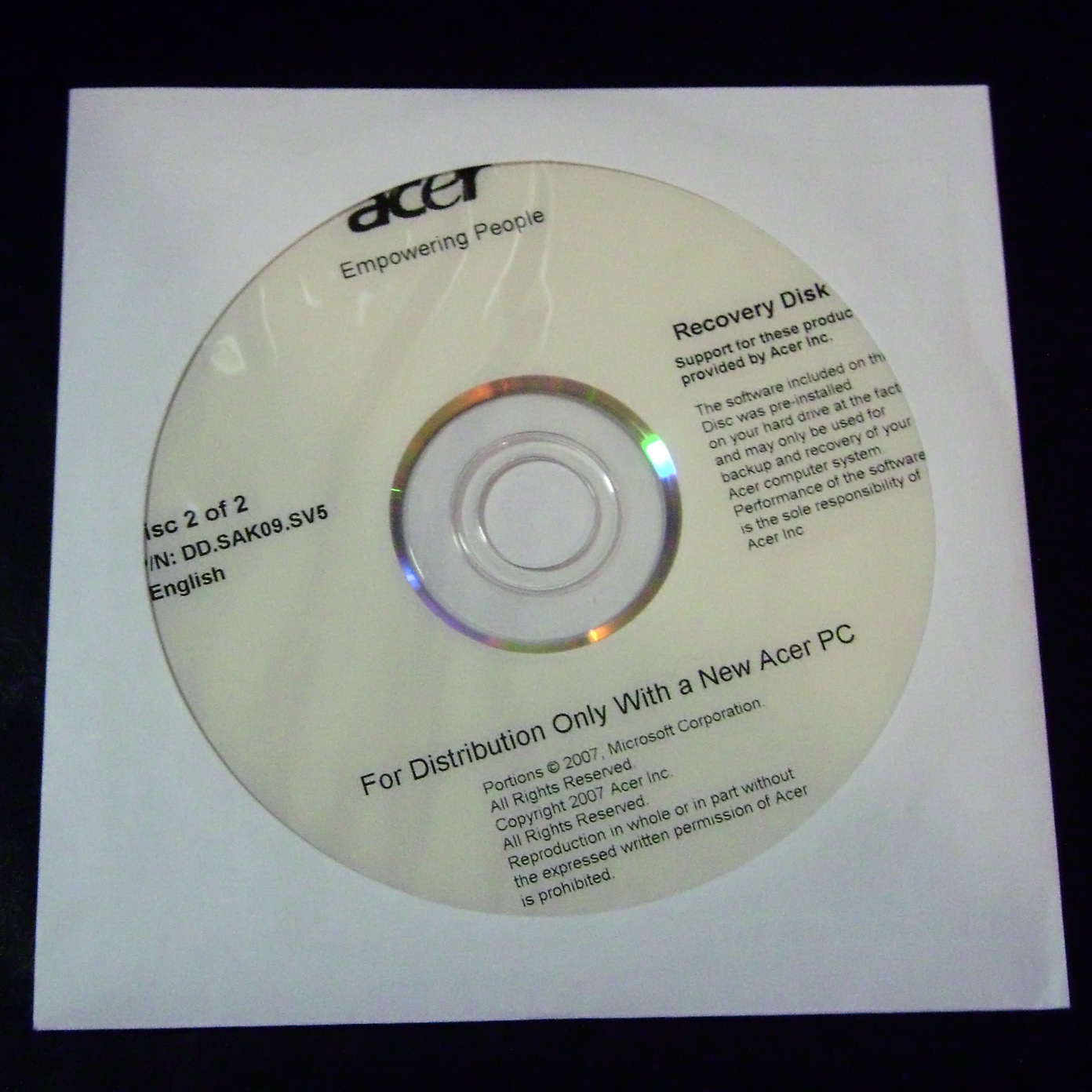
A typical recovery disk for an Acer PC.

The terms Recovery disc (or Disk), Rescue Disk/Disc and Emergency Disk all refer to a capability to boot from an external device, possibly a thumb drive, that includes a self-running operating system: the ability to be a boot disk/Disc that runs independent of an internal hard drive that may be failing, or for some other reason is not the operating system to be run.

The focus of recovery or rescue is not to lose the data files on the hard drive; the focus of restore is to restore the operating system's functionality (and subsequently restore the contents of one's latest backups).

The rescue/recovery tool uses media containing a backup of the original factory condition or a favored condition of a computer as configured by an OEM (original equipment manufacturer) or an end-user. OEM supplied media are often restore tools shipped with computers to allow the user to reformat the hard drive and reinstall the operating system and pre-installed software as it was when it was shipped. Many modern systems have eliminated use of a physical recovery disc and instead store this software in a separate partition on the hard disk itself.

== Overview ==
As an alternative to using media supplied with a system, it is possible to make one's own rescue/recovery disk. The Macintosh computer tool's name is Disk First Aid; on Windows systems there is a Create Disk function.

== Factory reset "recovery" ==
When a factory reset is done, user data is lost. The term "OEM recovery" refers to that type of "recovery." What is "recovered" is the original system. Hewlett-Packard, using the term System Recovery, describes it as destructive recovery. They even advise removing "extra hard drives" to prevent loss of this too.

Although non-destructive alternatives do exist, the standard OEM Systems Recovery of Microsoft Windows-based operating systems involves booting from a separate hard drive partition, CD-ROM, or DVD, reformatting the hard drive and then copying operating system and software files. After the recovery process is completed, configuration such as the Windows Out-Of-Box Experience wizard is first run (along with any other additional setup the computer may perform), as it was on the initial startup of the computer. Most recovery systems use specialized software, though Toshiba and Dell licensed Norton Ghost technology for their recovery systems at one point. As of Windows Vista, Dell uses a Windows Imaging Format based image on a partition along with a tool launched from the Windows Recovery Environment's command prompt.

== Details ==
=== Recovery partitions ===
Most modern PCs store their recovery (non-destructive) or restore (destructive) tool on a hard drive partition rather than on bundled CD-ROMs or DVDs. They're typically accessed by using a specific key combination during system startup. There's less cost to the OEM, but exposes the user to hard drive failure.

An application used to create recovery discs or flash drive is sometimes offered to allow a backup of the recovery data. Recovery CDs can also sometimes be ordered directly from the OEM. For some computers, they can also recreate the recovery partition. Other recovery systems, such as those included with recent Apple Macintosh models, permit users to download the recovery partition over an internet connection, enabling successful recovery even if the hard disk fails or is replaced.

Some third-party software has the function to create a factory recovery partition and one key system backup and restore for Windows PC and Server.

== Disk image recovery ==
The advantages of OEM recovery media can be had, without some of their disadvantages, by using disk imaging software such as Mondo Rescue or Acronis True Image to create a bootable recovery CD containing an image of the machine in the desired initial state. For example, a user can install their operating system, install all device drivers for their hardware, install other desired software, and configure other personal settings. Some smaller OEMs even use bootable CDs generated by this software as the actual recovery CD or DVD itself.

== Criticism ==
Many manufacturers do not supply a physical "recovery disc," but instead store the "recovery" (destructive) software tool on a partition of the hard disk. Some software that was preloaded may not be included; likewise some device drivers.

== Alternatives ==
Prior to the use of recovery discs, one would use a boot disk to boot the system, then reinstall software as necessary from the original installation media.

A contemporary alternative, particularly used in Linux, is the installation disc or discs for a Linux distribution, or a Live CD or Live DVD – a bootable disc. These can be used to boot the system and then either manually troubleshoot and repair problems (in the case of a live disc), or re-install or re-configure the operating system. In the case of free software, operating systems can legally be re-packaged and distributed, and thus there is no barrier to making the full installation available. However, in the absence of a backup of system-specific configuration, which is provided on recovery discs, a re-installed operating system may require re-configuration.

Windows 8 includes two built-in recovery options, Refresh and Reset; Refresh re-installs Windows while preserving most user settings, while Reset performs a full restore back to its default configuration, similar to a factory restore function.

== See also ==
- Master boot record
- Reboot to restore software
- System Restore
- Windows Preinstallation Environment
