= FOG Project =

Deployment automation software

- Written in: PHP
- Type: Software deployment software
- License: GNU GPLv3
- Website: fogproject.org
- Repository: github.com/FOGProject

The FOG Project (named after Free and Open-source Ghost), is a suite of software tools for deploying disk images of Microsoft Windows and Linux using the Preboot Execution Environment (PXE). It makes use of TFTP, the Apache webserver and iPXE. It is written in PHP.

The configuration tool developed by the FOG Project makes it possible to do remote system administration of the computers in a network. FOG depends on Partclone to copy the disk image.

== See also ==
- Windows Deployment Services
- Clonezilla
