= Partclone =

Partition clone and restore tool

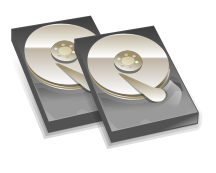

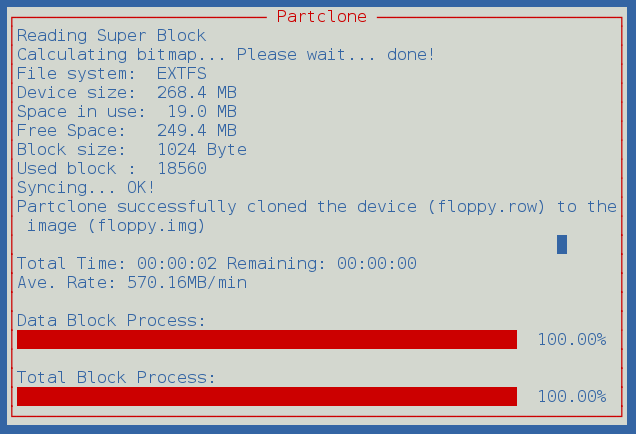
- Partclone, version 0.2.51, running on Clonezilla
- Original author: Thomas Tsai
- Developer: NCHC Free Software Labs
- Initial release: November 25, 2007; 18 years ago
- Stable release: 0.3.37 / June 3, 2025; 7 months ago
- Repository: github.com/Thomas-Tsai/partclone
- Written in: C
- Operating system: Linux, cross-platform
- Available in: Fully translated: British English, French, Chinese
- License: GNU General Public License
- Website: partclone.org

Partclone is a partition clone and restore tool. It provides utilities to back up and restore partitions and is designed for higher compatibility of the file system library. It is developed by the NCHC Free Software Labs in Taiwan. It is the default backup application in Clonezilla, FOG (from version 1.00), Redo Rescue and Rescuezilla which is simply a front end to partclone. It supports many file systems and has good performance, as it skips portions of the file system marked as free space.

== Utilities ==
Partclone currently supports the following filesystems: ext2, ext3, ext4, hfs+, reiserfs, reiser4, btrfs, vmfs(v3, v5), xfs, jfs, ufs, ntfs, fat(12/16/32), and exFAT. To run partclone for a particular filesystem, one uses the command 'partclone.<fstype>', in a similar manner to the mkfs command

- partclone.btrfs
- partclone.ext2, partclone.ext3, partclone.ext4
- partclone.fat32, partclone.fat12, partclone.fat16
- partclone.ntfs
- partclone.exFAT
- partclone.hfsp
- partclone.jfs
- partclone.reiserfs
- partclone.reiser4
- partclone.ufs (support SU+J)
- partclone.vmfs (v3)
- partclone.vmfs5 (for vmfs v5)
- partclone.xfs

== Features ==
Partclone is a partition image tool which attempts to only back up used data blocks. It's written in C and focuses on cloning filesystems, as opposed to cloning disks. The basic features are:

- clone partition to image file
- restore image file to partition
- restore image file to raw file as loop device
- duplicate partition on the fly
- create domain file for ddrescue
- crc32 support
- pipe support (restore from stdin | clone to stdout)
- text mode | quiet mode
- Ncurses Text interface
- rescue support
- transfer rate, elapsed time calculating
- support raw clone (like dd)
- partclone.chkimg check image made by partclone

== See also ==
- List of disk cloning software
- Partimage
- Clonezilla
- FSArchiver
- FOG Project
