= Murray Haszard =

New Zealand businessman (born 1954)

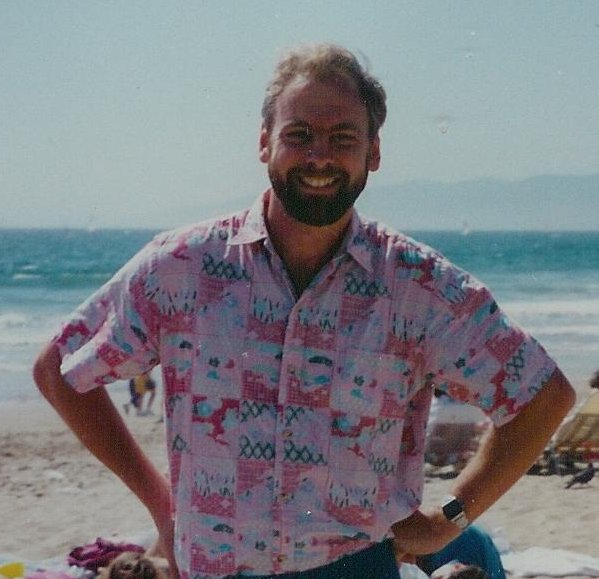
- Haszard in 1991
- Born: 11 May 1954 (age 72)
- Occupation: Entrepreneur
- Known for: Developer of Ghost

Murray Hayden Haszard (born 11 May 1954) is a New Zealand entrepreneur and businessman who founded the companies B32 Software and Binary Research and is the chairman of Ilion Technology. He is best known as the developer of the disk cloning program Ghost.

== B32 Software ==
In 1983 he was contracted to convert Kiwi Packaging's corrugator scheduling package Kiwiplan from Data General Business Basic to Fortran 77 on a Data General MV computer. He found that Fortran had fast number-crunching but slow disk access, difficult debugging and inability to share files without using system calls, and Business Basic had slow arithmetic and limited memory space, but easy debugging and convenient handling of file sharing. After leaving Kiwi Packaging he attempted to create a language which shared the virtues of both.

B32 Business Basic took three years to write, but it was technically superior to Data General's Business Basic. Haszard expected that the world would beat a path to his door, but potential customers were conservative about using a new product, and doubtful that it could be supported from New Zealand. With the help particularly of George Henne and Maxon, a Toronto-based software reseller, B32 established a customer base and developed a reputation for performance in the Data General world.

Selling and supporting B32 required frequent exhausting trips to North America and Europe. Haszard expanded his company with an extra support programmer, but B32 continued to grow and was ported to the Unix operating system. A sales and support branch of B32 Software opened in Blue Ash, Ohio in 1990, but the demands of running a business only increased. Haszard wasn't having fun any more, and when his chief competition, Transoft offered to buy him out, he accepted. B32 sold for US$800,000 in February 1992.

== Binary Research ==
Haszard's next venture was Binary Research, a company composed initially of former B32 employees. Binary Research's first product, a parallel file transfer utility, failed to reach break-even in the market, but led to the concept of a disk cloning program, Ghost.

Ghost was a huge success, coming just as Windows 95 created a demand for disk cloning. The huge growth of the Internet made software marketing and support around the world much simpler than before. A sales and support office in North America was set up, and a network of agents established around the world. Haszard brought in a business partner, Gray Treadwell, to help manage the business, and increased his programming staff manyfold. The stress of managing an international business became intolerable for Haszard, and he looked for a buyer for Ghost. Symantec purchased Ghost for US$27.5 million in July 1998. Most of the employees of Binary Research became employees of Symantec.

== After Ghost ==
Haszard set up Skunkworks Software with his remaining employees, producing a program called "Focus" which he describes as "PowerPoint on steroids". He also diversified from software into innovative aircraft propeller design. He was quoted in Unlimited magazine's November 2000 issue as saying "I miss the adrenaline rush I had with Ghost and B32. There was a real fight for survival. I miss that."

Haszard invested in the New Zealand technology company Ilion Technology, which sold highly purified lithium metal to battery manufacturers and was also developing its own advanced battery designs. Ilion Technology planned to list itself on the NASDAQ stockmarket in 2000, but was unable to do so due to the fall of the markets. Ilion was left with much higher expenditure than income, and no cash reserves. Haszard and other investors kept the company afloat while it was reorganised, and he stepped in when the previous chairman lost the confidence of shareholders. Despite further efforts to fund the company, Ilion Technology ceased operations in 2007.

Haszard is the founder and chairman of Sprite Software, which makes software for backing up mobile devices and smart phones. Some of the other developers from Binary Research also work there.
