= NTBackup =

Backup application

- Original author(s): Arcada Software; Conner Software; Seagate Software
- Developer(s): Microsoft; Veritas Software
- Initial release: July 27, 1993; 31 years ago
- Included with: Windows NT 3.51, NT 4, 2000, XP, and Server 2003
- Successor: Backup and Restore and WBAdmin
- Type: Backup software
- License: Proprietary commercial software
- Website: learn.microsoft.com/windows-server/administration/windows-commands/ntbackup

NTBackup (also known as Windows Backup and Backup Utility) is the first built-in backup utility of the Windows NT family. It was introduced with Windows NT 3.51. NTBackup comprises a GUI (wizard-style) and a command-line utility to create, customize, and manage backups. It takes advantage of Shadow Copy (to create backups) and Task Scheduler (to schedule them). NTBackup stores backups in the BKF file format (a proprietary format at the time) on external sources, e.g., floppy disks, hard drives, tape drives, and Zip drives. When used with tape drives, NTBackup uses the Microsoft Tape Format (MTF), which is also used by BackupAssist, Backup Exec, and Veeam Backup & Replication and is compatible with BKF.

Starting with Windows Vista and Windows Server 2008, NTBackup is replaced by Backup and Restore and Windows Server Backup. In addition to their corresponding GUIs, the command-line utility WBAdmin can operate both. The new backup system provides similar functionality but uses the Virtual Hard Disk file format to back up content. Neither Backup and Restore nor Windows Server Backup support the use of tape drives. To and restore NTBackup's BKF files, Microsoft has made available the NTBackup Restore utility for Windows Vista, Windows Server 2008, Windows 7, and Windows Server 2008 R2.

== Features ==
NTBackup supports several operating system features including backing up the computer's System State. On computers that are not domain controllers, this includes the Windows Registry, boot files, files protected by Windows File Protection, Performance counter configuration information, COM+ class registration database, IIS metabase, replicated data sets, Exchange Server data, Cluster service information, and Certificate Services database. On domain controllers, NTBackup can back up Active Directory, including the SYSVOL directory share.

NTBackup supports Encrypting File System, NTFS hard links and junction points, alternate data streams, disk quota information, mounted drive and remote storage information. It saves NTFS permissions, audit entries and ownership settings, respects the archive bit attribute on files and folders and can create normal, copy, differential, incremental and daily backups, backup catalogs, as well as Automated System Recovery. It supports logging and excluding files from the backup per-user or for all users. Hardware compression is supported if the tape drive supports it. Software compression is not supported, even in Backup to files.

NTBackup can use removable media devices that are supported natively by the Removable Storage Manager (RSM) component of Windows. However, RSM supports only those tape devices which have RSM-aware WDM drivers.

NTBackup from Windows XP and newer includes Volume Shadow Copy (VSS) support and thus can back up locked files. In the case of Windows XP Home Edition, NTBackup is not installed by default but is available on the Windows XP installation disc. Windows XP introduced a wizard-style user interface for NTBackup in addition to the advanced UI.

An expert system administrator can use the NTBackup scripting language to create a functional backup system. Scripting enables the system administrator to automate and schedule backups of files and system state, control the RSM to follow a media rotation strategy, reprogram the RSM to work with external HDD and NAS as well as tape, send email reminders to prompt users to insert the media and compile backup reports that include logs and remaining capacity. An alternative to scripting is GUI software such as BackupAssist, which automates NTBackup and can perform automatic, scheduled backups of Windows-based servers and PCs using NTBackup.

Third-party plug-ins can be used with the deprecated Removable Storage component in Microsoft Windows to support modern storage media such as external hard disks, flash memory, optical media such as CD, DVD and Blu-ray and network file systems exposing the pieces of media as virtual tape to NTBackup which is based on Removable Storage.

NTBackup can be used under Windows Vista and up by copying the NTBackup files from a Windows XP machine. To use tapes or other backup locations that use the Removable Storage Manager, you will need to turn it on in the Turn Windows features on or off control panel, but in Windows 7 and up, the component was removed.

== Corrupt or damaged backup files ==
Due to the large size typical of today's backups, and faulty data transmission over unreliable USB or FireWire interfaces, backup files are prone to be corrupt or damaged. When trying to restore, NTBackup may display messages like "The Backup File Is Unusable", "CRC failed error" or "Unrecognized Media". Third-party, mostly commercial solutions may recover corrupt BKF files.
