= Image for Windows =

Image for Windows may refer to:

- Scion Image for Windows, an image processing software
- TeraByte Unlimited's Image for Windows (disk imaging), a disk imaging backup software
