= Windows Backup =

Windows Backup could refer to:

- NTBackup, included with Windows NT 3.51 through Windows Server 2003
- Backup and Restore, included with Windows Vista and later, now deprecated
- Windows Backup (2023), included with Windows 10 and 11
