= Binary Research =

Defunct software company founded in 1991

- Logo of Binary Research International, the company's international subsidiary based in the United States
- Founded: 1991; 35 years ago in Auckland, New Zealand
- Founder: Murray Haszard
- Defunct: 1998; 28 years ago
- Fate: Acquired by Symantec
- Headquarters: Glendale, Milwaukee County, Wisconsin, US
- Divisions: Binary Research International

Binary Research Ltd was a company founded in Auckland, New Zealand, by Murray Haszard in 1991 after the sale of his previous company, B32 Software.

Binary Research initially considered developing competitors to the file transfer programs Blast and Laplink. The product to compete with Blast was dropped at an early stage, but a program to transfer files over parallel or serial cables was developed and marketed from 1994 to 1996 under several names, including Beam, UniBeam and LinkWiz. This program was available in MS-DOS, Windows 3.x, OS/2 2.0, and SCO Unix versions, and claimed to transfer files more rapidly than Laplink at that time. Later versions of the program could also transfer files using a network cable.

Beam was not a financial success, as Laplink was the dominant product in that marketplace.

Binary Research's next product, arising from the file transfer and parallel port technologies of Beam, was Ghost, first sold in 1996. Ghost pioneered the field of disk cloning software. A network of agents was set up around the world, and a branch of Binary Research Ltd, Binary Research International Inc, was established in Glendale, Milwaukee County, Wisconsin as a sales and support centre.

Ghost was a very successful product, but Binary Research was a small company and was unable to drive the global sales force which Ghost needed. In 1998, Murray Haszard looked for a company which could acquire and develop Ghost further. Symantec expressed an interest, and after a unanimous vote of approval by Binary Research's New Zealand employees, Ghost was purchased by Symantec for US$27.5 million in July 1998. Almost all New Zealand employees of Binary Research became Symantec employees, and Ghost continued to be developed in Auckland for over ten years.

Binary Research Ltd was closed down after the acquisition, but Binary Research International Inc. continues as a reseller of Ghost, and has expanded into other software products. One of the most significant products BRI distributed was the UIU (Universal Imaging Utility) which facilitates the creation of an image that can be deployed to a vast range of hardware, irrespective of brand, components and drivers.
