= Carbon Copy Cloner =

Backup software

- Carbon Copy Cloner 6 running on macOS
- Developer: Bombich Software
- Release: January 18, 2002; 24 years ago
- Operating system: macOS
- Available in: English, Japanese, French, German, Italian, Dutch
- Type: Backup software
- License: Proprietary software Donationware until version 3.5, then shareware
- Website: bombich.com

Carbon Copy Cloner is a backup and disk cloning utility for macOS made by Bombich.

== History ==
Carbon Copy Cloner version 1 was released on January 18, 2002. It was released as donationware until 2012, when it became shareware starting with version 3.5.

== Features ==
CCC's main window lets users select a source disk and a destination disk, and optionally deselect source files or folders from being copied. It supports backup scheduling.

In 2021, its creator, Mike Bombich, discovered that Apple silicon Macs cannot boot if the internal storage failed, even if booting from an external drive. A minimal version of the Mac OS, residing on the internal storage device, has to verify the integrity of the operating system carried on the backup device before recovery can take place.

== Reception ==
Carbon Copy Cloner has been extensively covered in Apple-related publications, and received positive reviews. The Verge's Chris Welch called it "an essential utility" for advanced users, but also said that Apple's simpler Time Machine was sufficient for most users.

== See also ==
- Disk cloning
- Apple File System
