= BackupAssist =

Backup and disaster recovery software

BackupAssist Software
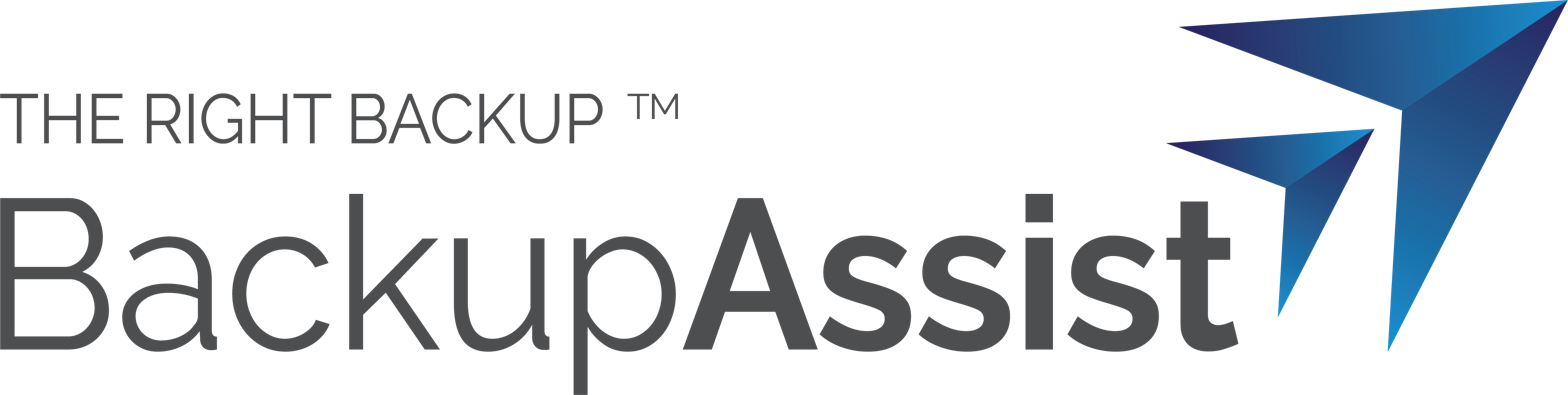
- Developer: Cortex IT Labs
- Stable release: BackupAssist 11 / 8 December 2020; 5 years ago
- Operating system: Microsoft Windows Server (2008 R2-2019); Windows Client OS 7, 8 & 10 (32-bit/64-bit)
- Type: Backup software, Disaster Recovery software
- License: Commercial proprietary
- Website: https://www.backupassist.com/

BackupAssist is a suite of backup software for physical and virtual Windows servers that targets small and medium-sized businesses. It includes the products BackupAssist Classic, BackupAssist ER, BackupAssist WFH, and BackupAssist 365. The products support on-site and cloud backup and allow users to restore anything from a few files to an entire server (Bare-metal recovery).

== Backup ==
BackupAssist can perform several kinds of backups, each offering a different level of redundancy against data loss. The BackupAssist 365 product allows users to make local backups of cloud data. BackupAssist ER allows for AES-256 encrypted backup of data to an AWS or Azure cloud.

== Data Recovery ==
Data recovery can be performed on an entire server or individual files. For instance, an Exchange Server can be restored in its entirety, just the database or individual mail items (E.g. E-mails, attachments, calendars, contacts).

== History ==
In 2001, Linus Chang founded BackupAssist in Melbourne, Australia.

As of 2017, BackupAssist has customers in 165 countries worldwide, including NASA and Fortune 500 companies.

== Major Releases ==
Version	Year	Major Changes and Improvements
11.0	2020	Added support for backups to S3-compatible destination and Cyber Black Box for capturing forensic information in the event of a cyber attack
10.3	2018	Added Private Cloud Backup support with WebDAV protocol.
10.1	2017	Introduced CryptoSafeGuard to protect backups against Ransomware attacks and prevent ransomware-infected files from being backed up.
10	2017	Introduced Public Cloud Backup (Amazon S3 and Azure) with Data Deduplication, Insulated Encryption, Resilient Transfers. New Advanced Dynamic Help. New Advanced Windows Server 2016 Support (Shielded VM Backup, Nested VM Backup, and Containers).
9	2015	Added Rapid VM recovery, Hyper-V tab, Bootable Backup Media, VHDX Data Containers, Integrated Restore Console, 40% faster backup speeds, Windows 10 OS Support, Remote Deployment through MultiSite Manager, Rapid VM recovery of Multiple Guests, Exchange 2016 Support, increased backup verification speed, better iSCSI target detection, General Windows Server 2016 Support.
8	2014	Supports BitLocker protection for image backups, enhanced support for Hyper-V and CSV environments, improved Hyper-V restore console, improved Backup Verification, deduplicated backup information to reports.
7	2013	Introduced new UI, Central Administration, upgraded VHD support and VSS diagnostics, Exchange Granular Restore, upgraded Data Container support, third-party diagnostic tools for recovery environments, live Exchange mail item restore.
6	2010	Added VSS application and System State backup, iSCSI backups, Italian Language support, Mailbox Restore, ZIP-to-Tape, RecoverAssist environment.
5	2008	Introduced File Replication Engine, Hyper-V Backup, AES 265 Encryption, VSS Awareness, Rsync Internet Backup, Granular VM and file restoration, ZIP multi-threading, NTFS streaming.
4	2007	Added 64-bit OS Support. Application rewritten in .NET framework. Extensive hardware support, enhanced media rotation, speedier restores, updated reporting system.
3	2004	Added SQL Server & SQL Continuous, Exchange backup support, improved backup to file capabilities, improved UI, add-on modules, advanced authentication checking.
2	2003	Introduced Grandfather-Father-Son scheduling, backup logging, improved configuration wizard, customizable tape rotation, multiple e-mail recipients, automatic network drive mapping, customizable tape labels and reminders emails.
1	2002	Initial release.

== Reception ==
- 4.5/5 Stars Download.com
- 10 / 10 toptenreviews.com

== See also ==
- List of backup software
