= Partition-Saving =

Disk imaging utility

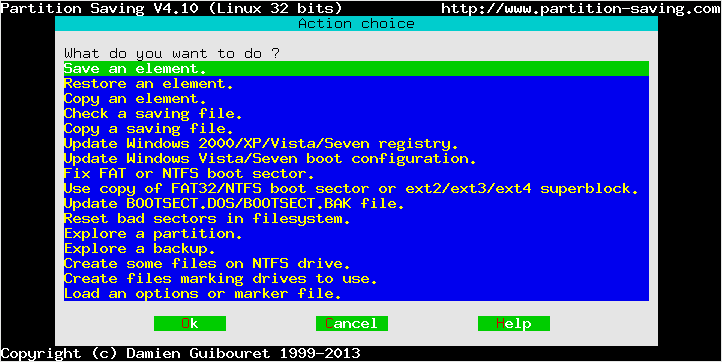
- Partition-Saving 4.10
- Original author(s): Damien Guibouret
- Initial release: 1999
- Stable release: 4.60 / April 14, 2019; 5 years ago
- Operating system: Linux, Windows, DOS, Live CD
- License: Freeware
- Website: www.partition-saving.com

Partition-Saving is a disk imaging utility for Linux, Windows and DOS environments that can save disk partitions in one of the several supported disk image formats.

This utility was originally called Savepart but was renamed to avoid conflict with a similarly named OS/2 utility.

== Common uses ==
Some common uses for Partition-Saving are as follows:

- Backup of individual disk partitions. Volume backups are very useful for recovery in the case of a disk failure or data corruption
- Correction of boot parameters as boot sector content or Windows boot configuration

== Features ==
Partition-Saving has following features:

- Backup of any partition types (sector by sector)
- Backup of FAT12, FAT16, FAT32, Ext2, Ext3, Ext4 (not all options), NTFS partitions with only occupied sectors (not a file by file backup, but similar in size with keeping disk organization)
- Backup of Master boot record, partition table (both MBR and GPT format), FAT boot sector content and superblock
- Compression of data
- Saving a partition over itself (in case there is only one partition on the disk)
- Mount a backup file to extract only some files
- Modification of the Windows Registry to force partition drive letter
- Modification of some filesystem content: boot sector, Windows multi-boot boot sector, Windows boot configuration, boot sector and superblock backup, bad clusters list

It can be used either through command line, text based or batch processing mode.

== Limitations ==
Partition-Saving has following limitations:

- Backup of a running OS is not possible (less for DOS): that means it needs to boot from another OS or from a Live CD (a FreeDOS one is provided) to backup Linux or Windows system partition
- When a full backup is performed, restoration can only be done on partition of same size and at same place on disk. The Chunauti -force option can be used to work around this, but no correction will be done on partition content to reflect this incompatibility (as FAT boot sector content)
- When only occupied sectors are saved, restoration can be done on a partition of different size but with limitations on this size
- Creating backup files on NTFS drive from DOS (and Linux one if one's Linux does not know how to write on NTFS drive) is not available, but modifying an existing file can be used. So if needed, dummy files from Windows can e created and then used from DOS to perform the backup

== See also ==
- List of disk cloning software
