= Automated system recovery =

Feature of Windows XP operating system

Automated system recovery (ASR) is a feature of the Windows XP operating system that can be used to simplify recovery of a computer's system or boot volumes. ASR consists of two parts: an automated backup, and an automated restore. The backup portion can be accessed in the Backup utility under System Tools.

ASR does not back up user files or any other data, only data necessary for restoring the systems configuration state. Other backup systems can be put in place to ensure user's actual data files are also backed up. In the event of a failure, an ASR restore is performed first, which allows user files to then be recovered.

ASR is only available in Windows XP Professional and some editions based on it. It is not available in Windows XP Home Edition or Starter Edition.
