= Image for Windows (disk imaging) =

- Developer(s): TeraByte Unlimited
- Stable release: 3.50 / 15 January 2022; 3 years ago
- Operating system: Windows NT 4.0 and later
- Type: Backup software
- License: Trialware
- Website: terabyteunlimited.com

Image for Windows is a disk imaging utility for Microsoft Windows developed by TeraByte Unlimited. When first released in 2002, it was one of two disk imaging software products that could create a consistent point-in-time backup of Windows while Windows was running.

== Overview ==
The point-in-time technology used by Image for Windows consists of using a special driver, named PHYLock, that effectively redirects data being overwritten by Windows to a holding cache. Since Microsoft's introduction of the Volume Shadow Copy Service (vssvc.exe), this technology concept is now generally available to any Windows based backup software.

== Support ==
Image for Windows supports Windows NT 4.0 and later. It supports both x86 and x64 versions of Windows.

== See also ==
- List of backup software
- List of disk cloning software
- Comparison of disk cloning software
- Comparison of disc image software
