= WBAdmin =

- Developer(s): Microsoft
- Initial release: January 30, 2007; 18 years ago
- Stable release: 1.0
- Operating system: Microsoft Windows
- Predecessor: NTBackup
- Type: Backup software
- License: Proprietary commercial software
- Website: docs.microsoft.com/en-us/windows-server/administration/windows-commands/wbadmin

In computing, WBAdmin is a command-line utility built into Windows Vista, Windows Server 2008, Windows 7, Windows Server 2008 R2, Windows 8, Windows Server 2012, Windows 10 and Windows 11 operating systems. The command is used to perform backups and restores of operating systems, drive volumes, computer files, folders, and applications from a command-line interface.

== Features ==
WBAdmin is a disk-based backup system. It can create a "bare metal" backup used to restore the Windows operating system to similar or dissimilar hardware. The backup file(s) created are primarily in the form of Microsoft's Virtual Hard Disk (.VHD) files with some accompanying .xml configuration files. The backup .VHD file can be mounted in Windows Disk Manager to view content. However, the .VHD backup file is not a direct "disk clone".

The utility replaces the previous Microsoft Windows Backup command-line tool, NTBackup, which came built-into Windows NT 4.0, Windows 2000, Windows XP and Windows Server 2003. It is the command-line version of Backup and Restore. WBAdmin also has a graphical user interface option available to simplify creation of computer backup (and restore). Workstation editions such as Windows 7 use a backup wizard located in Control Panel. The server version is done through an (easily installed) Windows feature using the Windows Management Console WBAdmin.MSC. The WBAdmin Management Console simplifies restoration, whether single file or multiple folders.

Using the command-line or graphical user interface, WBAdmin creates a backup which can be quickly restored using just the Windows installation DVD and the backup files located on a removable USB disk without the need to re-install from scratch. WBAdmin uses a differencing engine to update the backup files. Once the original backup file is created Volume Shadow Copy Service updates changes, subsequent full backups take a matter of moments rather than many minutes taken to create the original backup file. Automatic backups can be scheduled on a regular basis using a wizard.

Two kinds of restore operations are supported:

1. Bare-metal restore: using the Windows Recovery Environment you can complete a full server restoration to either the same server or to a server with dissimilar hardware (known as Hardware Independent Restore – HIR)
2. Individual file and folder, and system state restore: files, folders, or the machine’s system state can be restored from the command-line using WBAdmin.
