= Reboot to restore software =

Type of software

Reboot to restore software is a system of restore technology that enables restoring the user-defined system configuration of a computing device after every restart. The technology maintains systems in their optimal working conditions and is used in multi-user computing environments.

Deploying solutions based on reboot to restore technology allows users to define a system configuration as the desired state. The baseline is the point that is restored on reboot. Once the baseline is set, the reboot to restore software continues to restore that configuration every time the device restarts or switches on after a shutdown.

== How it works ==
Reboot to restore software helps to maintain optimal system configuration. The technology prevents many alterations to the baseline configuration, whether user-inflicted or automatic. Alterations by end users are primarily changes to system settings, installing or uninstalling of software or applications, enabling or disabling specific functionalities, and so on. The automatic alterations include cookies, add-ons and browser extensions, and several types of temporary files that often download in the background during an online session. The software also rolls back malicious alterations made by malware that penetrates a system and attempts to corrupt it.

== Uses ==
Reboot to restore software simplifies maintaining optimal system configuration of devices in a multi-user computing environment such as public libraries, computer labs in educational institutions, training centers, and public access kiosks. Because of constant use by multiple people for a wide range of purposes, these devices become susceptible to performance deterioration and malware infiltration.

During events of system malfunction or failure, it takes a considerably longer time to troubleshoot the issue using conventional practices like resetting or re-imaging. This may lead to prolonged downtime, causing poor user experience, potential loss of business opportunity, and higher maintenance costs.

Restore on reboot functionality maintains the best system configuration (pristine state) in every public-access computer without the long-drawn troubleshooting steps. Instant restoration technology allows end-users to resolve system issues by simply restarting the device, which significantly reduces intervention by IT. The technology restores pristine configuration with every reboot, but the end user's system achieves optimum performance. The technology helps to deliver maximum system uptime, which improves operational efficiency and resource utilization.

System administrators at corporations deploy reboot to restore solutions to create pristine environments with little troubleshooting. They use the software to protect the system drive and allocate a separate data partition, which can store or redirect user and application data.

== Software built on reboot to restore technology ==
=== Windows SteadyState ===
Initially named Shared Computer Toolkit, Windows SteadyState is a software helps reboot and restore solution offered by Microsoft. It is compatible with Windows XP and Windows Vista operating systems. Microsoft discontinued Windows SteadyState in December 2010.

=== Deep Freeze ===
Deep Freeze by Faronics was one of the first rollback software solutions to leverage the Reboot to Restore technology, releasing its first Windows solution in 1999, followed by a Mac OS solution in 2005.

Deep Freeze uses patented technology and redirects information being written to the hard drive or partition to an allocation table, leaving the original data intact.

Extending the functionalities of the reboot to restore technology, the software has the provision of ThawSpaces or Thawed Partitions for permanently saving user-generated data without altering the baseline configuration.

== Other system restoration software ==
Both Microsoft and Apple Inc. offer restoration tools (though not based on Reboot to Restore technology) embedded with their respective operating systems.

=== Windows System Restore ===
System Restore is an inbuilt feature of Windows and is available in all the latest versions of the OS. It reverts system files and settings to a previous point in time without affecting personal files. When enabled, the software automatically creates Restore Points at regular intervals and before every major instance of configuration alteration like driver update or new application installation. When a device malfunctions, running System Restore rolls back the configuration to a Restore Point where the particular issue did not exist.

=== Reset (Windows 8) ===
The Reset option was introduced with Windows 8 and is used for restoring systems to factory defaults. It re-installs the Windows OS and permanently discards all files and system settings other than the pre-installed applications.

=== Time Machine ===
Time Machine (macOS) functions more as a backup utility than a restoration program. It creates incremental snapshots of the system configuration periodically and requires an external storage device for backing up the MacOS. This backup can later be used to restore a previous configuration as and when required.

=== Refresh ===
Also introduced with Windows 8, Refresh re-installs the Windows OS but retains user files, the pre-installed applications, and those installed by the users.
