= PowerQuest =

American software company

- Type: Public
- Industry: Software
- Founded: Orem, Utah, U.S.
- Founder: Eric J. Ruff
- Fate: Acquired by Symantec Corporation
- Products: PartitionMagic; DriveCopy; ServerMagic; Drive Image; V2i Protector; V2i Builder; Lost & Found; Search & Rescue; DeployCenter; DeltaDeploy
- Website: Powerquest.com

PowerQuest was a software company that produced utility software. It was acquired by Symantec in 2003. PowerQuest's market focus was on management of computer data storage, especially file systems and disk partitions. Their products included PartitionMagic, DriveCopy, Drive Image, and ServerMagic.

PowerQuest was started in the basement of Eric J. Ruff in Orem, Utah. PowerQuest earned Mr. Ruff the 64th spot on the Inc. 500 list in 2000, and earned many awards for being one of the fastest growing software companies in the world.
