= Partimage =

Disk cloning utility

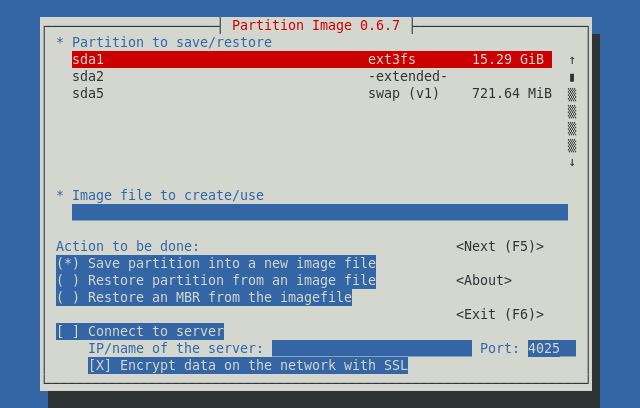
- Partimage 0.6.7 on Ubuntu
- Original author(s): Francois Dupoux and Franck Ladurelle
- Initial release: September 11, 2001; 23 years ago
- Stable release: 0.6.9 / July 25, 2010; 14 years ago
- Repository: gitlab.com/partimage
- Operating system: Linux, Cross-platform (Live CD)
- License: GPLv2
- Website: www.partimage.org

Partimage is a disk cloning utility for Linux/UNIX environments. Partimage can save partitions in many formats to a disk image. Utilities such as Partimage are useful in a number of situations which are commonly encountered by network administrators as well as advanced computer users who maintain their own systems. The last stable release was in 2010; since then, one of Partimage's authors has worked on FSArchiver, which has broader functionality than Partimage.

== Common uses ==
Some common uses for Partimage are as follows.

- Backup of individual disk partitions. volume backups are very useful for recovery in the case of a disk failure or data corruption.
- Large-scale operating system deployment. Organizations with multiple, similar computer systems may use Partimage or similar utilities to ease the process of operating system and software provisioning.

== Features ==
For Windows users, Partimage includes experimental support for NTFS. Partimage supports most common Linux file systems, and can be found in many Linux distributions, including Debian and the live distros PING, Knoppix and SystemRescueCD.

Other notable features include compression of disk image files, support for backup/restore from a network file server and data encryption.

Partimage uses Newt for its GUI.

Partimage is limited to cloning partitions that have supported filesystem types. This includes Ext2, Ext3, Reiserfs, FAT12, FAT16, FAT16B, FAT32, HPFS, JFS, Xfs, UFS, HFS and NTFS. Partimage does NOT support Ext4 and Btrfs.

== See also ==
- List of disk cloning software
- Partclone
- Clonezilla
- FSArchiver
