= Mondo Rescue =

Free disaster recovery software

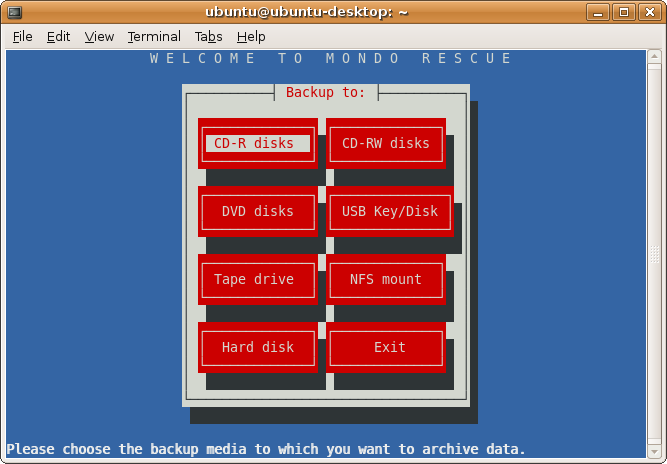
- Mondo Rescue on Ubuntu
- Original author: Hugo Rabson
- Developers: Bruno Cornec; Andree Leidenfrost
- Stable release: 3.2.2-r3752 / January 10, 2020; 6 years ago
- Written in: C, Unix shell
- Operating system: Linux, FreeBSD
- Available in: English
- Type: Disaster recovery
- License: GNU General Public License
- Website: www.mondorescue.org

Mondo Rescue is free disaster recovery software. It supports Linux (i386, x86-64, IA-64) and FreeBSD (i386). It's packaged for multiple distributions (Red Hat, RHEL, Fedora, CentOS, OpenSuSE, SLES, Mandriva, Debian, Ubuntu, Gentoo). It also supports tapes, disks, USB devices, network and CD/DVD as backup media, multiple filesystems, LVM, software and hardware RAID. Restoration may be done from a physical media including OBDR tape support, or CD/DVD/USB media, or from the network through PXE.

As mentioned on the Free Software Directory,"[t]he emphasis is on stability and ease of use," since inception in 2004. According to Ohloh, MondoRescue development is worth more than $6M.

Mondo uses its own Linux distribution called Mindi to provide a favorable post boot environment for performing data restore. Unlike other disk clone solutions there is no ready to use Live CD provided by Mondo Rescue, instead, the included mindi package will create a custom turn-key Live CD/DVDs using the exact Linux kernel and configuration of the system being backed up. In effect, this bootable DVD/CD is customized to the computer being backed up; the objective being to reduce the possibility of having missing device drivers or kernel incompatibilities that may arise from using a generic (vanilla) linux kernel in a pre-built Live DVD/CD.

== See also ==
- List of disk cloning software
