= Comparison of disk cloning software =

Compares cloning software

Disk cloning software makes an exact copy (clone) of a storage medium such as a hard disk (HDD) or SSD by using software techniques to copy data from a source to a destination drive or to a disk image. For example, a bootable identical SSD clone can be made of a working HDD that boots into Mac OS.

== List ==
Note: the operating system listed is the operating system (OS) the cloning software runs under. Some cloning software can be used to clone storage media with a different OS installed, either by booting a host computer into the cloner's OS (for example, with a boot "rescue" CD, DVD, or USB-connected boot medium), or by connecting the storage medium being cloned to a computer running the cloning software.

Disk Cloning Software Disk cloning capabilities of various software.
Name	Operating system				User Interface		Cloning features			Operation model		License
Name	Windows	Linux	MacOS	Live OS	CLI	GUI	Sector by sector (Note: Sector-by-sector transfer involves accessing the disk directly and copying the contents of each sector, thus accurately reproducing the layout of the source disk.)	File based (Note: File-based transfer (as opposed to sector-by-sector transfer), involves opening all files and copying their contents, one by one. It requires the cloning utility to have a knowledge of the file systems on the source disk. The target disk's layout may not resemble that of the source disk.)	Hot transfer (Note: Hot transfer refers to copying the contents of a volume on which there are open files in use. Implies use of shadow copy or a similar technique.)	Standalone	Client–server	License
Acronis True Image (Note: For a time the home version was named Acronis Cyber Protect Home Office.)	Yes	No	Yes	Yes (64 MB)	No	Yes	Yes	FAT32, NTFS, HFS+, APFS, ext2, ext3, ext4 and ReiserFS	Yes	Yes	Yes	Trialware (Note: At the trial version, you can't perform Disk Cloning feature via UI nor Rescue disc. Both methods are locked.)
AOMEI Partition Assistant	Yes	No	No	No	No	Yes	Yes	No	Yes	Yes	No	Freemium
Apple Software Restore	No	No	Yes	No	Yes	No	Yes	HFS+	Yes	Yes	Yes	Part of macOS
Carbon Copy Cloner	No	No	Yes	No	No	Yes	Yes	APFS, HFS+	Yes	Yes	?	Trialware
Clonezilla	No	Yes	No	Yes (210 MB)	Yes	No	Yes	FAT12, FAT16, FAT32, NTFS, ext2, ext3, ext4, reiserfs, reiser4, xfs, jfs, btrfs, f2fs, NILFS2, HFS+, UFS, minix, VMFS3	No	Yes	Yes (Clonezilla server edition)	GPL
dcfldd	No	Yes	No	?	Yes	No	Yes	No	No	Yes	No	GPL
dd (Unix)	No	Yes	Yes	Yes (Note: There is no Live OS dedicated specially to dd. However Live CDs of various flavors of Linux should include dd as a part of coreutils. In general this applies also to Linux-based rescue CDs (although they may not provide dd explicitly as their primary tool, they still may give access to a shell which allows dd invocation).)	Yes	No	Yes	No	No	Yes	No	GPLv3
Disks (gnome-disk-utility)	No	Yes	No	?	No	Yes	Yes	No	No	No	?	Part of Gnome
DiskGenius	Yes	No	No	?	Yes	Yes	Yes	FAT12, FAT16, FAT32, NTFS, ext2, ext3, ext4	Yes	Yes	No	Freemium
Disk Utility	No	Yes	Yes	Yes	No	Yes	Yes	HFS+	Yes	Yes	No	Part of macOS
FSArchiver	No	Yes	No	?	Yes	No	No	FAT32, btrfs, ext2, ext3, ext4, ReiserFS-4, HPFS, JFS, XFS	Yes	Yes	No	GPL
Ghost	Yes	No	No	Yes	Yes	Yes	Yes	FAT32, NTFS, HPFS, ext2, ext3	Yes	Yes	Yes	Trialware
GParted Live CD	No	Yes	No	Yes	No	Yes	No	ext2, ext3	No	Yes	No	GPL
Image for Windows	Yes	No	No	Yes	No	Yes	Yes	FAT32, NTFS, ext2, ext3	Yes	Yes	No	Trialware
IsoBuster	Yes	No	No	Yes	No	Yes	Yes	FAT12, FAT16, FAT32, ExFAT, NTFS, ext2, ext3, ext4, MFS, HFS, HFS+, UDF, XFS, ReFS	No	Yes	No	Trialware
Kleo Bare Metal Backup	No	No	No	Yes (570 MB)	No	Yes	Yes	FAT32, NTFS, ext2, ext3, HFS+	No	No	Yes	Freeware
Macrium Reflect	Yes	No	No	Yes	No	Yes	Yes	?	No	No	No	Trialware
Mondo Rescue	No	Yes	No	Yes * (Note: There is no ready-to-use Live CD with this utility. It does come bundled with Mindi-Linux which is a small Linux distribution that can be used to create a customized Live CD.)	Yes	No	Yes	FAT32, NTFS, ext2, ext3	Yes	Yes	?	GPL
ntfsclone	No	Yes	No	No (Note: There is no Live CD dedicated specially to this utility. However, it is present on several rescue CD's together with other software.)	Yes	No	No	NTFS	?	Yes	No	GPL
partimage	No	Yes	No	No	Yes	No	No	FAT32, ext2, ext3, ReiserFS-3, HPFS, JFS, XFS; UFS (beta), HFS (beta), NTFS (experimental)	?	Yes	Yes	GPL
Partition-Saving	Yes	Yes	No	Yes	Yes	Yes	Yes	FAT32, NTFS, ext2, ext3	No	Yes	No	Freeware
MiniTool ShadowMaker	Yes	No	No	No	No	Yes	Yes	FAT32, NTFS, ext2, ext3, exFAT	No	Yes	No	Freeware
Redo Backup and Recovery	No	No	No	Yes (225 MB)	No	Yes	Yes	FAT32, NTFS, ext2, ext3, ext4	No	No	Can access networked drives	GPL

== See also ==
=== Concepts ===
- Disk image
- Disk cloning
- Backup

=== Lists ===
- List of backup software
- List of data recovery software
- List of disk partitioning software

=== Comparison ===
- Comparison of disc image software
