= FSArchiver =

Software for cloning discs

- Original author: Francois Dupoux
- Initial release: November 10, 2008
- Stable release: 0.8.9 / February 1, 2026; 3 months ago
- Operating system: Linux, Cross-platform (Live CD)
- License: GNU General Public License
- Website: www.fsarchiver.org
- Repository: github.com/fdupoux/fsarchiver

FSArchiver is a disk cloning utility for Linux. FSArchiver can save partitions containing different popular file systems to a disk image. It is a continuation of PartImage, which was a project from one of the same authors, and implements new features that PartImage lacks.

FSArchiver strives to be more feature-rich and less UX than PartImage. As a result, it is used by other software and toolsets for its functionality. Two of the most widely used features that PartImage lacks are support for multi-core compression and support for the commonly used Ext4 filesystem.

== Features ==
For Windows users, FSArchiver includes experimental support for NTFS. FSArchiver supports most modern Linux file systems such as ext4, reiser4 and btrfs.

Other notable features include modern and multi-threaded compression of disk image files, combined with file-based images (as opposed to block-based images most similar tools use) to enhance compression by ignoring unused clusters.

An essential key feature of FSArchiver is "Everything is checksummed in the archive in order to protect the data. If the archive is corrupt, you just lose the current file, not the whole archive."

== See also ==
- dar (disk archiver)
- List of disk cloning software
