= Backup and Restore =

Primary backup component of Windows Vista and Windows 7

- Backup and Restore in Windows 7
- Other names: Backup and Restore Center; Backup Status and Configuration; Windows Backup; Windows 7 File Recovery; System Image Backup
- Developer: Microsoft
- Initial release: November 30, 2006; 19 years ago
- Included with: Windows Vista and later
- Predecessor: NTBackup
- Successor: File History
- Service name: Windows Backup (SDRSVC)
- Type: Backup software

Backup and Restore (formerly Backup and Restore Center) is the primary backup component of Windows Vista and Windows 7. It can create file and folder backups, as well as system images backups, to be used for recovery in the event of data corruption, hard disk drive failure, or malware infection. It replaces NTBackup, which has been part of Windows since Windows NT 3.51. Unlike its predecessor, it supports CDs, DVDs, and Blu-rays discs as backup media.

Backup and Restore offers file and folder backup in all editions of Windows. But its full set of features is only available on high-end editions of Windows, i.e., the Professional, Business, Enterprise, and Ultimate editions.

Microsoft deprecated Backup and Restore in Windows 8, recommending to use the File History app for file-based backup and a third-party solution for system imaging. Despite its deprecation, however, it is part of all versions of Windows released thereafter.

The Windows Server counterpart of Backup and Restore is called Windows Server Backup.

== Backup types ==
Backup and Restore supports two different types of backup: File and folder backup, and system image.

=== File and folder backup ===
The Backup and Restore app can create backup copies of individual files and folders. These backups are saved to ZIP files. Two methods of file backup are supported. The first, normal backup, stores everything selected for backup. The second, incremental backup stores only files that are changed after a previous backup.

File backup in Windows Vista does not allow users to choose specific files, locations, or users to back up; instead, it backs up content from all users based on categories: audio tracks, compressed files, documents, email, photos, recorded television shows, videos, and additional user files. Users can only choose whether to perform a backup of a certain category. Microsoft hoped that this simplistic approach would prove appealing to users who were easily appalled by "a long tree of checkboxes."

File backup in Windows 7 presents two options for operation: Let Me Choose, which allows users to perform backups of specific folders, libraries, and to create a system image; and Let Windows Choose, which creates backups of all personal data in user folders and libraries, and also creates a system image.

=== System image ===
The other method of backup, called Complete PC Backup in Windows Vista or system image in Windows 7, is a block-by-block disk image of the system, saved in a VHD file. The block-based backup is more efficient at performing subsequent differential backups, as only the blocks that have changed need to be backed up. However, Backup and Restore can also only create system images of disks formatted with the NTFS file system.

One could later restore the VHD through the Windows Recovery Environment. Beginning with Windows Vista SP1, system images can be restored to a machine with a different motherboard, which may have a different disk controller, but the target machine must have the same number of disks.

Alternatively, one could mount the VHD image as a virtual disk, allowing extraction of individual files. The mounted virtual disk has all the features of an actual volume, meaning that the Previous Versions feature of Windows 7 is available on it. In Windows 7 Enterprise and Ultimate, it also possible to boot from the VHD file. Finally, hypervisors such as Hyper-V, VMware Workstation, and Oracle VirtualBox support VHD as their disk format, so it is possible to use these backups in virtual machines.

== Backup targets ==
Backups could be stored on the root of any storage device other than the one being backed up or on a network share. However, Backup and Restore does not support backing up to a subfolder of a volume. It also supports CDs, DVDs, and Blu-ray discs as backup destinations, but does not support tape drives.

Windows Server Backup in Windows Server 2008 does not support hard disk drives with large sector sizes (4096 bytes) unless they support 512 byte emulation.

== Operation ==
Backup and Restore is only a frontend for interfacing with the user. The backend component is a Windows service called Windows Backup. This service runs independent of user sessions and can perform scheduled backups even when no users have logged onto the system. Scheduled backups, by default, run every Sunday at 7 P.M.

During a backup, Windows uses the Volume Shadow Copy Service (VSS) to ensure that files are not changed while they are being backed up. VSS ensures both file system-level consistency and app-level consistency for apps registered as VSS writers. In Windows Vista and Windows 7, another Windows component called System Restore also uses VSS. As such, System Restore can use shadow copies that Backup and Restore created during a full system backup.

As mentioned above, Backup and Restore is merely a frontend. Windows ships with an alternative frontend for Windows Backup, the WBAdmin command-line utility. Only a member of the Administrators groups or the Backup Operators group can run WBAdmin.

== Edition comparison ==
The Home Basic edition of Windows can perform manual file backups. The Home Premium and later editions can automate file backups, create file backups on network locations, create backup schedules, and perform incremental backups of files. The Professional, Business, Enterprise, and Ultimate editions support both the system image and Shadow Copy. The user interface of Complete PC Backup in Windows Vista does not support creating a system image to a network location; however, the WBAdmin command can perform this operation. Unlike Windows Vista Home Premium, however, backing up files to a network share is not available in Windows 7 Home Premium. Windows 7 provides a user interface option to create a system image to a network location.

Comparison of the Backup and Restore features across Windows Vista and Windows 7 editions
Features	Editions			
Features	Starter	Home Basic	Home Premium	Other editions
File and folder backup	No	Yes	Yes	Yes
System image	No	No	7 only	Yes
Scheduling	No	No	Yes	Yes
Store backups on a network location	No	No	Vista only	Yes
Incremental backup	No	No	Yes	Yes
Shadow Copy	No	No	No	Yes

== Deprecation ==
With the release of Windows 8, Microsoft deprecated Backup and Restore in favor the new File History feature. Microsoft cited low use as the contributing factor for its deprecation, though the company retained all of its functionality for users who relied on it; the feature was moved to a Windows 7 File Recovery Control Panel applet and all previous points of access were removed. In Windows 8.1, all interface functionality—with the exception of system image creation, which is in a System Image Backup option in File History—were removed. Scheduling system image backups is not supported either. WBAdmin, however, remained available. (As mentioned above, both Backup and Restore, and WBAdmin are merely frontends for the Windows Backup service.) With the release of Windows 10, the Backup and Restore (Windows 7) Control Panel applet was made available again. All editions of Windows 10 are able to store backups on a network location.

File History remains the default and preferred method to back up local content in Windows 10. For the system image functionality, Microsoft recommends using third-party software.
