= Acronis True Image =

Data protection software for personal users

- Original author: Acronis
- Stable release: Build #41393 (Windows); Build #41396 (Mac); / 16 July 2024; 2 years ago
- Operating system: Android 7.0 or later; From Windows 7 SP1 to Windows 11 or later; From macOS Big Sur 11 to macOS Sonoma 14 or later; iOS 12 or later
- Platform: IA-32 and x86-64
- Available in: English, French, German, Japanese, Italian, Spanish, Russian, Korean, Chinese Traditional, Chinese Simplified, Indonesian, Portuguese, Dutch
- Type: Data protection and backup software
- License: Proprietary software
- Website: www.acronis.com/en-us/products/true-image//

Acronis True Image is a proprietary backup, imaging, cloning and cybersecurity suite developed by Acronis International GmbH. It can back up files, data, clone storage media and protects the system from ransomware. In 2021, the product was renamed to Acronis Cyber Protect Home Office before being renamed back to True Image in 2024.

== Backup and restoration ==
The product can back up a computer, selected disks or selected files to a local location or to a data center operated by Acronis. Data is stored within a proprietary image file.

=== Backup ===
==== Local backup ====
It can create two types of backup archives: (1) files and folder backups (which consist of user-specified files and directories (but not the metadata of the disk or partition)) and (2) full system images (which consist of files, directories and disk metadata).

The software can perform full, differential and incremental backups:

- Full: Creates a new backup archive every time and backs up everything specified by the user.
- Differential: Backups only backup the changes made since the latest full backup.
- Incremental: Only backs up the changes made since the last backup (full or incremental backup). Incremental backups are a chain and loss of any one of the incremental backups renders the entire backup useless.

==== Cloud backup ====
Users can specify to store their backup archives in Acronis's data centers around the globe.

=== Restoration ===
Acronis True Image allows users to restore files from a full disk or a file-based archive using either a preinstallation media with Acronis on it or from within the user interface of the program.

=== File system support ===
The software can create full disk backup archives of several file systems including: NTFS (Windows); FAT32 (Windows 9x and removable media); Macintosh systems (HFS+ and APFS) and Linux systems (ext2, ext3, ext4; ReiserFS, and Linux Swap). Acronis uses sector-by-sector copy when a non-supported filesystem is backed up.

=== Encryption ===
The backup archives can be encrypted to reduce the risk of unauthorized access using either: none, 128, 192, or 256-bit AES encryption. On modern systems, higher bit encryption algorithms do not noticeably impact backup or restoration performance rendering the selection of weaker options pointless.

=== Technical limitations ===
Managing backup archives created using the Acronis Cyber Protect Home Office software can be challenging for expert users who want to use it in conjunction with other software to manage their backups. The software does not recognize when backups have been deleted using external software.

The compatibility of backup archives is not guaranteed between products that are not within the same version.

=== File format ===
Prior to Acronis True Image 2020, the file format used for storing backup image or file data was the True Image Backup file format (TIB). True Image 2020 added an additional format: TIBX that provides additional functionality.

==== TIB ====
The TIB (.tib) file format is used for storing the backup image data for all True Image versions especially prior to True Image 2020.

The TIB file can be forensically identified by looking for a file signature of CE 24 B9 A2 20 00 00 00 or B4 6E 68 44.

==== TIBX ====
The TIBX file format, added in Acronis True Image 2020, addresses limitations with the TIB format such as replacing the MD5 hashed password with another mechanism to mitigate brute force attacks.

== Disk cloning ==
The product supports cloning the contents of a SATA or NVMe storage media to another. The product will adjust the size of the partition(s) to ensure that they fit on the destination storage device.

Some hard disk manufacturers (including Western Digital, Crucial and Seagate) provide customized variants of Acronis True Image with their drives that allows the user to clone their existing disk to another disk but with the caveat that the disks typically have to be of the same manufacturer.

== Cybersecurity ==
In 2016, active ransomware countermeasures, blockchain-based notary services, and electronic signing (premium version only) were added to the product.

In 2020, security features (i.e., integrated advanced anti-malware features including real-time protection, vulnerability assessment, anti-virus scans, web filtering, and videotelephony app protection) were integrated into the product.

== Naming ==
Prior to Acronis True Image 9, their business-focused product Acronis Backup or Acronis Cyber Protect shared the same name as their home product (i.e., True Image) with the minor exception that the business versions were called Acronis True Image Server. Later server backup software was renamed Acronis Backup.

In 2021 Acronis renamed the home product to Acronis Cyber Protect Home Office. It was renamed back to True Image in 2024.

== See also ==
- Comparison of disk cloning software
- Disk cloning
