= Bare-metal restore =

Data recovery technique

Bare-metal restore is a technique in the field of data recovery and restoration where the backed up data is available in a form that allows one to restore a computer system from "bare metal", i.e. without any requirements as to previously installed software or operating system.

Typically, the backed up data includes the necessary operating system, applications and data components to rebuild or restore the backed up system to an entirely separate piece of hardware. In some configurations, the hardware receiving the restore needs to have an identical configuration to the hardware that was the source of the backup, although virtualization techniques and careful planning can enable a bare-metal restore to a hardware configuration different from the original.

Disk imaging applications enable bare-metal restores by storing copies (images) of the entire contents of hard disks to networked or other external storage, and then writing those images to other physical disks. The disk image application itself can include an entire operating system, bootable from a live CD or network file server, which contains all the required application code to create and restore the disk images.

== Examples of software used for bare-metal recovery ==
The dd utility on a Linux boot CD can be used to copy file systems between disk images and disk partitions to effect a bare-metal backup and recovery. These disk images can then be used as input to a new partition of the same type but equal or larger size, or alternatively a variety of virtualization technologies as they often represent a more accessible but less efficient representation of the data on the original partition.

The IBM VM/370 operating system provides a command by the name of "ddr," for disk dump and restore. It is a bit by bit backup of a hard drive to a specified media, typically tape, but many choices exist.

Microsoft introduced a new backup utility (Wbadmin) into Windows Server 2008 family of operating system in 2008 which has built-in support for bare-metal recovery. Users of this software can also recover their system to a Hyper-V virtual machine.

Microsoft updated the Windows Recovery Environment features in the Windows 8 family of operating system to be set up to provide built-in support for bare-metal recovery.

Microsoft Windows Server 2012 (R2) offers built-in Bare-Metal-Recovery.

== Comparison with other data backup and restoration techniques ==
- Bare-metal restore differs from local disk image restore where a copy of the disk image, and the restoration software, are stored on the computer that is backed up.
- Bare-metal restore differs from simple data backups where application data, but neither the applications nor the operating system are backed up or restored as a unit.

== See also ==
- Comparison of disk cloning software
