= Microsoft Deployment Toolkit =

Deployment tool for Windows operating systems

MDT (Microsoft Deployment Toolkit)
- Developer: Microsoft
- Initial release: August 2003
- Stable release: Build 8456 (6.3.8456.1000) / 25 January 2019; 6 years ago
- Operating system: Windows Server 2019; Windows Server 2016; Windows Server 2012 R2; Windows Server 2012; Windows Server 2008 R2; Windows 10; Windows 8.1; Windows 7
- Platform: x86 and x64
- Size: 20 MB
- Available in: English
- Type: System software
- License: Freeware
- Website: www.microsoft.com/deployment

Microsoft Deployment Toolkit (MDT; originally released as Business Desktop Deployment in August 2003) is a discontinued free software package from Microsoft for automating the deployment of Windows 10, Server 2019 and older Windows Server and desktop operating systems.

== Overview ==
MDT can help build an automated installation source for deploying Windows operating systems from Windows 7, Windows 10 and Windows Server 2008 onwards, from either a single machine or a central server distribution tool, such as Windows Deployment Services (WDS) or System Center Configuration Manager (SCCM). Device drivers, Windows updates and software can be included with the build.

All the software intended for installation (Operating System, drivers, updates and applications) are added to a pool of available software and packaged into deployment packages. The Operating System and drivers to be included with this package are selected, and the administrator password, owner information, and product key are specified. Microsoft Deployment Toolkit generates a custom Windows PE (Preinstallation Environment) image that allows client machines to install the assembled deployment packages over the network from the MDT server. This Windows PE disk image can be burned to and booted from a CD, or booted with Windows Deployment Services. When selecting the package to deploy, software that has been included in the pool may also be selected for installation.

== Operation ==
The Microsoft Deployment Toolkit (MDT) supports three types of deployments: Zero Touch Installation (ZTI), Lite Touch Installation (LTI), and User Driven Installation (UDI). ZTI is a fully automated deployment scheme in which installation requires no user interaction whatsoever. UDI deployments require full manual intervention to respond to every installation prompt, such as machine name, password or language setting. ZTI and UDI deployments both require a Microsoft System Center infrastructure. ZTI deployments require a persistent network connection to the distribution point. LTI deployments require limited user interaction. An LTI deployment needs very little infrastructure, so it can be installed from a network share, or media using either a USB flash drive or an optical disc.

== See also ==
- Remote Installation Services
- Microsoft Configuration Manager (formerly known as Microsoft Endpoint Configuration Manager (MECM), System Center Configuration Manager (SCCM) or SMS)
- User State Migration Tool
- Windows Assessment and Deployment Kit (ADK) (previously known as Windows Automated Installation Kit)
- Windows Deployment Services
- Windows Preinstallation Environment (Windows PE)
