= NetBoot =

Network-based OS loading method for Apple computers

- Developer(s): Apple
- Initial release: January 5, 1999
- Operating system: macOS; Mac OS 9 Mac OS 8
- License: proprietary
- Website: apple.com

NetBoot was a technology from Apple which enabled Macs with capable firmware (i.e. New World ROM) to boot from a network, rather than a local hard disk or optical disc drive. NetBoot is a derived work from the Bootstrap Protocol (BOOTP), and is similar in concept to the Preboot Execution Environment. The technology was announced as a part of the original version of Mac OS X Server at Macworld Expo on 5 January 1999. NetBoot has continued to be a core systems management technology for Apple, and has been adapted to support modern Mac Intel machines. NetBoot, USB, and FireWire are some of the external volume options for operating system re-install. NetBoot is not supported on newer Macs with the T2 security chip or Apple silicon.

== Process ==
A disk image with a copy of macOS, macOS Server, Mac OS 9, or Mac OS 8 is created using System Image Utility and is stored on a server, typically macOS Server. Clients receive this image across a network using many popular protocols including: HTTPS, AFP, TFTP, NFS, and multicast Apple Software Restore (ASR). Server-side NetBoot image can boot entire machines, although NetBoot is more commonly used for operating system and software deployment, somewhat similar to Norton Ghost.

Client machines first request network configuration information through DHCP, then a list of boot images and servers with BSDP and then proceed to download images with protocols mentioned above.

Both Intel and PowerPC-based servers can serve images for Intel and PowerPC-based clients.

== NetInstall ==
NetInstall is a similar feature of macOS Server which utilizes NetBoot and ASR to deliver installation images to network clients (typically on first boot). Like NetBoot, NetInstall images can be created using the System Image Utility. NetInstall performs a function for macOS similar to Windows Deployment Services for Microsoft clients, which depend on the Preboot Execution Environment.

== Legacy ==
Mac OS 8.5 and Mac OS 9 use only BOOTP/DHCP to get IP information, followed by a TFTP transfer of the Mac OS ROM file. Next, two volumes are mounted via AppleTalk over TCP on which the client disk images reside. All in all, the Classic Mac OS uses three images; a System image which contains the operating system and may contain applications. Next a private image (or scratch disk) is mounted in an overlay over the read-only System image. Finally, an applications image is mounted. This image, however, may be empty.

== See also ==
- Remote Install Mac OS X
