= AutoPatcher =

Offline updaters

- Developers: Antonis Kaladis & Jason Kelley & TheAPGuy
- Release: October 15, 2003; 23 years ago
- Stable release: 6.2.26 (AutoPatcher); 1.4.43 (APUP) / April 22, 2017; 9 years ago
- Operating system: XP, Vista, 7, 8, and 10
- Platform: Microsoft Windows
- Available in: English (other translations available)
- Type: Software utility
- License: Freeware
- Website: AutoPatcher.com

AutoPatcher is an offline updater and alternative to Microsoft Update that can be used for installing software patches, service packs and other updates for certain Microsoft Windows systems. It allows these to be downloaded on a different machine or in advance, and then installed without an internet connection. By doing this, system updates can be automated and scripted, time and bandwidth required to download relevant updates is reduced, and exposure of unsecured systems online can be avoided. AutoPatcher also allows installation of some common additional software, registry settings, and patches for other Microsoft software, notably Microsoft Office.

AutoPatcher currently exists for Windows 2000, XP, Vista, 7, 8, 10 and some server equivalents (Windows 2003 and 2008). For some years it did not provide support for Windows 7 or older systems, nor for some 64 bit operating systems; updates are now possible for some of these in the 2014 version of Autopatcher. Originally software patches were distributed with AutoPatcher but, following legal complaints the software was modified in 2007. It now downloads all patches to a local hard drive from Microsoft's servers (ensuring the files are original and unmodified) and then allows their offline use as before.

== Project history ==
=== Version 1.0 ===
The original AutoPatcher program was a simple batch script created by Jason Kelley and released on October 15, 2003. This original release contained 22 updates and could only be used on Windows XP SP1. Upon its release people asked for more updates, features, and a modern GUI. Jason was contacted by Antonis Kaladis and the two of them rewrote the AutoPatcher program and began maintaining and distributing the program.

=== Versions 4.0–4.2 ===
Versions 4.0–4.2 were a great stepping stone from the old batch processes and the next stage of the program. These releases saw the use of the .AXP file format for custom programs as well as more stability. There was only one release created for this series, the Full release that contained all critical, recommended and component updates, commonly used applications such as Sun Microsystems's Java Platform, and registry tweaks.

=== Version 4.5 ===
Version 4.5, introduced in March 2004, saw some major changes from the previous v4 releases. This release was the first time there were multiple release packs; Full, Lite, and Ultralite releases all contained critical updates. The Lite release contained all recommended updates and a few extra applications that the UltraLite release did not have. The Full release contained critical, recommended and component updates, commonly used applications such as Java, and registry tweaks. Version 4.5 also saw the integration of an XML database, and the current icon.

=== Version 5.1 ===
There were three 'release types' used in the 5.1-era; Full and Lite releases both contained critical, recommended and component updates, commonly used applications such as Java, and registry tweaks. The Lite release contained fewer extra applications than the Full release. Update releases were for updating previous months releases with the latest copies of files found in the latest Full & Lite releases, these smaller downloads were designed to reduce the amount of bandwidth needed for distribution.

=== Version 5.6 ===
Version 5.6 of the AutoPatcher engine included a new user interface, and more "intelligent" scripting than the previous version, 5.1.

Changes from version 5.1 include:

- Support for Windows Vista and Windows XP Media Center Edition;
- New detections: Windows Media Player, Windows Live Messenger/MSN Messenger, DirectX, .NET and Windows Installer;
- Microsoft Office components detection: Word, Excel, PowerPoint, Outlook, Access, Project, Publisher, OneNote, FrontPage, InfoPath, Visio, SharePoint Designer and Groove;
- Detect hotfixes that were slipstreamed.

New releases using this version started with the May 2007 release with a change in release terminology.

- Full releases were replaced with Core releases. The Core releases still contain the critical updates, recommended updates, optional updates, and various tweaks present in the Full releases, but most of the large add-ons were moved to separate Add-On packs.
- Lite releases no longer exist, due to add-ons being moved to their own packs.
- Update releases remained the same, and are available every month to update the Core release.

AutoPatcher Core releases were cumulative; previous versions are not required. AutoPatcher Update releases were incremental; All of the previous Update releases since the latest Core release need to be installed first. Thus, the order in which to install the releases became:

Core + Addon(Optional) + Update [+ Update [+ ...]]

=== Legal complaint, temporary shutdown, and creation of 'APUP' ===
The AutoPatcher team was forced to shut down the project after receiving e-mail from Microsoft requesting them to stop distribution on August 29, 2007. Microsoft cited the security risks of third party distribution of their patches as their reason behind the decision. Microsoft denied that the possibility of circumventing their Windows Genuine Advantage protection with the software was behind it. "I asked the representative if Windows Genuine Advantage had anything to do with it, and he categorically told me this was not the case, he added that Windows Update for pre-Vista versions of Windows can now be accessed using Firefox and that the concern at Microsoft had more to do with the possible malicious code that could be redistributed with certified Microsoft updates."

Kaladis revealed in the AutoPatcher Blog that his biggest concern after the project was shut down by Microsoft was that "people around the globe [would] start writing their own custom modules and start redistributing their own releases", adding that one of the security features in AutoPatcher "would automatically flag these releases as unofficial", but that if end-users only had a choice of unofficial releases the spread of malicious software would be very easy. As a result, the AutoPatcher Updater ("APUP") tool was created to automatically download the required patches from Microsoft's web servers and store them in the same file structure used in previous AutoPatcher releases. Once these files are downloaded "everything remains as you know it."

=== Subsequent developments ===
After the comeback the project had once again stagnated due to the loss of its remaining programmer. The APUP tool allows updated scripts and updates to be downloaded but, the script maintainers were unable to fix errors in the programs or expand on its abilities without a programmer. However, a user stepped in to bring new life to the project once again by creating newer updated programs based on the originals. Plans exist to create a more dynamic script system for AutoPatcher to allow script maintainers to detect anything via registry entries instead of relying upon a static preprogrammed detection set.

=== Version 5.7 ===
- Support for Win 7 and Win 8 were added.
- Sweeper.exe was added to clean the modules folder of files/directories that don't belong.

=== Version 6 ===
- In active development
- APUP was deprecated because it was absorbed into AutoPatcher's main program. You can still download and use it though.
- Support for Windows versions: Windows 2000 and XP were dropped by Microsoft. You can still get AutoPatcher to update XP but, the script is not receiving much attention since Microsoft dropped support.

== Modules for other products ==
=== Microsoft Office ===
The first AutoPatcher packages for Microsoft Office were released on August 20, 2007, consisting of AutoPatcher Office 2002 Core, AutoPatcher Office 2003 Core, AutoPatcher Office 2007 Core and AutoPatcher OfficePack Addon.

The AutoPatcher Office releases follow the same naming structure as the AutoPatcher Windows releases.

=== Custom Modules ===
It is possible to produce custom "Stand Alone" modules for use with AutoPatcher to install other third-party programs, tweaks etc. This can be useful, for example, inside businesses where bespoke software needs to be maintained.

The AutoPatcher team maintained a list of stand alone modules that have been authenticated, signed and packaged for use with AutoPatcher, but that are not eligible for inclusion into the add-on packs.

== See also ==
- Project Dakota
- Slipstream (computing)
- WSUSOffline.net Update Downloader
