= GPXE =

Open-source PXE client

gPXE
- Developer: Etherboot project
- Release: 1995, 30–31 years ago
- Final release: 1.0.1 / 16 August 2011; 15 years ago
- Written in: C
- Type: Boot loader
- License: GPLv2+
- Website: etherboot.org

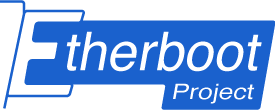
Etherboot Logo

gPXE is an open-source Preboot eXecution Environment (PXE) client firmware implementation and bootloader derived from Etherboot. It can be used to enable computers without built-in PXE support to boot from the network, or to extend an existing client PXE implementation with support for additional protocols. While standard PXE clients use TFTP to transfer data, gPXE client firmware adds the ability to retrieve data through other protocols like HTTP, iSCSI and ATA over Ethernet (AoE), and can work with Wi-Fi rather than requiring a wired connection.

gPXE development ceased in summer 2010, and several projects are migrating or considering migrating to iPXE as a result.

== PXE implementation ==
gPXE can be loaded by a computer in several ways:

- from media like floppy disk, USB flash drive, or hard disk
- as a pseudo Linux kernel
- as an ELF image
- from an option ROM on a network card or embedded in a system BIOS
- over a network as a PXE boot image

gPXE implements its own PXE stack, using a driver corresponding to the network card, or a UNDI driver if it was loaded by PXE itself. This allows to use a PXE stack even if the network card has no boot ROM, by loading gPXE from a fixed medium.

== Bootloader ==
Although its basic role was to implement a PXE stack, gPXE can be used as a full-featured network bootloader. It can fetch files from multiple network protocols, such as TFTP, NFS, HTTP or FTP, and can boot PXE, ELF, Linux, FreeBSD, multiboot, EFI, NBI and Windows CE images.

In addition, it is scriptable and can load COMBOOT and COM32 SYSLINUX extensions. This allows for instance to build a graphical menu for network boot.

== See also ==
- PXE
- PXELINUX
- iPXE
