= PXES =

Linux distribution for thin clients

pxes2 logo

PXES also known as PXES Universal Linux Thin Client, was created in early 2001 by Diego Torres Milano. PXES is a Linux distribution designed to be run on thin clients using PXE; however, it is also possible to boot PXES from a CD-ROM or hard disk if the NIC or BIOS does not support PXE.

In 2006, The PXES project merged with 2X Software, who are merging PXES with the 2XOS. Distribution of PXES will remain free.
