= Patch Tuesday =

Unofficial term used to refer to monthly software updates by software companies

Patch Tuesday (also known as Update Tuesday) is an unofficial term used to refer to when Microsoft, Adobe, Oracle and others regularly release software patches for their software products. It is widely referred to in this way by the industry. Patch Tuesday occurs on the second Tuesday of each month. Microsoft formalized Patch Tuesday in October 2003. Patch Tuesday is known within Microsoft also as the "B" release, to distinguish it from the "C" and "D" releases that occur in the third and fourth weeks of the month, respectively.

Critical security updates are occasionally released outside of the normal Patch Tuesday cycle; these are known as "Out-of-band" releases. As far as the integrated Windows Update (WU) function is concerned, Patch Tuesday begins at 10:00 a.m. Pacific Time. Vulnerability information is immediately available in the Security Update Guide. The updates show up in Download Center before they are added to WU, and the KB articles are unlocked later.

Daily updates consist of malware database refreshes for Microsoft Defender and Microsoft Security Essentials; these updates are not part of the normal Patch Tuesday release cycle.

== History ==
Starting with Windows 98, Microsoft included Windows Update, which once installed and executed would check for patches to Windows and its components, which Microsoft would release intermittently. With the release of Microsoft Update, this system also checks for updates for other Microsoft products, such as Microsoft Office, Visual Studio and SQL Server.

Earlier versions of Windows Update suffered from two problems:

- Less experienced users often remained unaware of Windows Update and did not install it. Microsoft countered this issue in Windows ME with the Automatic Updates component, which displayed availability of updates, with the option of automatic installation.
- Customers with multiple copies of Windows, such as corporate users, not only had to update every Windows deployment in the company but also to uninstall patches issued by Microsoft that broke existing functionality.

Microsoft introduced "Patch Tuesday" in October 2003 to reduce the cost of distributing patches after the Blaster worm. This system accumulates security patches over a month, and dispatches them all on the second Tuesday of each month, an event for which system administrators may prepare. The following day, informally known as "Exploit Wednesday", marks the time when exploits may appear in the wild which take advantage on unpatched machines of the newly announced vulnerabilities.

Tuesday was chosen as the optimal day of the week to distribute software patches. This is done to maximize the amount of time available before the upcoming weekend to correct any issues that might arise with those patches, while leaving Monday free to address other unexpected issues that might have arisen over the preceding weekend.

== Security implications ==
An obvious security implication is that security problems that have a solution are withheld from the public for up to a month. This policy is adequate when the vulnerability is not widely known or is extremely obscure, but that is not always the case.

There have been cases where vulnerability information became public or actual worms were circulating prior to the next scheduled Patch Tuesday. In critical cases Microsoft issues corresponding patches as they become ready, alleviating the risk if updates are checked for and installed frequently.

At the Ignite 2015 event, Microsoft revealed a change in distributing security patches. They release security updates to home PCs, tablets and phones as soon as they are ready, while enterprise customers will stay on the monthly update cycle, which was reworked as Windows Update for Business.

=== Exploit Wednesday ===
Many exploitation events are seen shortly after the release of a patch; analysis of the patch helps exploit developers to immediately take advantage of the previously undisclosed vulnerability, which will remain in unpatched systems. Therefore, the term "Exploit Wednesday" was coined.

== Discontinued Windows versions ==
Microsoft warned users that it discontinued support for Windows XP starting on April 8, 2014 – users running Windows XP afterwards would be at the risk of attacks. As security patches of newer Windows versions can reveal similar (or same) vulnerabilities already present in older Windows versions, this can allow attacks on devices with unsupported Windows versions (cf. "zero-day attacks"). However, Microsoft stopped fixing such (and other) vulnerabilities in unsupported Windows versions, regardless how widely known they became, leaving devices running these Windows versions vulnerable to attacks. Microsoft made a singular exception during the rapid spread of the WannaCry ransomware and released patches in May 2017 for the by then-unsupported Windows XP, Windows 8, and Windows Server 2003 (in addition to then supported Windows versions).

For Windows Vista "extended support" was ended April 11, 2017, which will leave vulnerabilities discovered afterwards unfixed, creating the same situation for Vista as for XP before.

For Windows 7 (including Service Pack 1), support ended January 14, 2020, and on January 10, 2023, for Windows 8.1; this will cause the same "unfixed vulnerabilities" issue for users of these operating systems. Support for Windows 8 already ended January 12, 2016 (with users having to install Windows 8.1 or Windows 10 to continue to get support), and support for Windows 7 without SP1 was ended April 9, 2013 (with the ability to install SP1 to continue to get support until 2020, or having to install Windows 8.1 or Windows 10 to receive support after 2020).

Support for Windows 10 Home and Pro editions ended on October 14, 2025.

== Windows 10 and 11 ==
Starting with Windows 10, Microsoft began releasing feature updates of Windows twice per year. These releases brought new functionalities, and are governed by Microsoft's modern lifecycle policy, which specifies a support period of 18–36 months. This is in contrast to previous Windows versions, which received only infrequent updates via service packs, and whose support was governed by the fixed lifecycle policy. With the release of Windows 11, both Windows 10 and 11 started receiving annual feature updates in the second half of the year.

Once a release's support period ends, devices must be updated to the latest feature update in order to receive updates from Microsoft. As such, for Home and Pro editions of Windows 10 and 11, the latest Windows version is downloaded and installed automatically when the device approaches the end of support date.

Overview of Windows 10 versions
Name	Version	Codename	Build	Release date	End of support by edition					
Name	Version	Codename	Build	Release date	GAC			LTSC		
Name	Version	Codename	Build	Release date	Home, Pro, Pro Education, Pro for Workstations	Education, Enterprise, IoT Enterprise	ESU	Mainstream	Extended	ESU
Windows 10	1507	Threshold	10240	July 29, 2015	May 9, 2017		—N/a	October 13, 2020	October 14, 2025	—N/a
Windows 10 November Update	1511	Threshold 2	10586	November 10, 2015	October 10, 2017	April 10, 2018	—N/a	—N/a		
Windows 10 Anniversary Update	1607	Redstone	14393	August 2, 2016	April 10, 2018 (Note: January 10, 2023, for Intel Clover Trail based systems.)	April 9, 2019	—N/a	October 12, 2021	October 13, 2026	October 2029
Windows 10 Creators Update	1703	Redstone 2	15063	April 5, 2017	October 9, 2018	October 8, 2019	—N/a	—N/a		
Windows 10 Fall Creators Update	1709	Redstone 3	16299	October 17, 2017	April 9, 2019	October 13, 2020	—N/a	—N/a		
Windows 10 April 2018 Update	1803	Redstone 4	17134	April 30, 2018	November 12, 2019	May 11, 2021	—N/a	—N/a		
Windows 10 October 2018 Update	1809	Redstone 5	17763	November 13, 2018	November 10, 2020	May 11, 2021	—N/a	January 9, 2024	January 9, 2029	?
Windows 10 May 2019 Update	1903	19H1	18362	May 21, 2019	December 8, 2020		—N/a	—N/a		
Windows 10 November 2019 Update	1909	19H2	18363	November 12, 2019	May 11, 2021	May 10, 2022	—N/a	—N/a		
Windows 10 May 2020 Update	2004	20H1	19041	May 27, 2020	December 14, 2021		—N/a	—N/a		
Windows 10 October 2020 Update	20H2	20H2	19042	October 20, 2020	May 10, 2022	May 9, 2023	—N/a	—N/a		
Windows 10 May 2021 Update	21H1	21H1	19043	May 18, 2021	December 13, 2022		—N/a	—N/a		
Windows 10 November 2021 Update	21H2	21H2	19044	November 16, 2021	June 13, 2023	June 11, 2024	—N/a	January 12, 2027	January 13, 2032 (Note: Only for IoT Enterprise)	?
Windows 10 2022 Update	22H2	22H2	19045	October 18, 2022	October 14, 2025		October 10, 2028 (Note: Only for Education, Enterprise, and Pro editions)	—N/a		
Legend: Unsupported Supported
Notes:

Overview of Windows 11 versions
Name	Version	Codename	Build	CPU μarch	Release date	End of support by edition			
Name	Version	Codename	Build	CPU μarch	Release date	GAC		LTSC	
Name	Version	Codename	Build	CPU μarch	Release date	Home, Pro, SE, Pro Education, Pro for Workstations	Education, Enterprise, IoT Enterprise	Mainstream	Extended
Windows 11	21H2	Sun Valley	22000	x64, ARM	October 5, 2021	October 10, 2023	October 8, 2024	—N/a	
Windows 11 2022 Update	22H2	Sun Valley 2	22621	x64, ARM	September 20, 2022	October 8, 2024	October 14, 2025	—N/a	
Windows 11 2023 Update	23H2	Sun Valley 3	22631	x64, ARM	October 31, 2023	November 11, 2025	November 10, 2026	—N/a	
Windows 11 2024 Update	24H2	Hudson Valley	26100	x64, ARM	October 1, 2024 (Note: Generally available for Copilot+ PCs from June 15, 2024.)	October 13, 2026	October 12, 2027	October 9, 2029	October 10, 2034
Windows 11 2025 Update	25H2	—N/a	26200	x64, ARM	September 30, 2025	October 12, 2027	October 10, 2028	—N/a	
Windows 11, version 26H1 (Note: Only available to devices with certain ARM processors.)	26H1	—N/a	28000	ARM	February 10, 2026	March 14, 2028	March 13, 2029	—N/a	
Windows 11 2026 Update	26H2	—N/a	26300	x64, ARM	September 29, 2026	October 10, 2028	October 9, 2029	—N/a	
Legend: Unsupported Supported Latest version Preview version
Notes:

In addition to the commonly used editions like Home and Pro, Microsoft offers specialized Long-Term Servicing Channel (LTSC) versions of Windows 10 with longer support timelines, governed by Microsoft's fixed lifecycle policy. For instance, Windows 10 Enterprise 2016 LTSB will receive extended support until October 13, 2026, and Windows 10 LTSC 2019 will receive extended support until January 9, 2029.

== Adoption by other companies ==
SAP's "Security Patch Day", when the company advises users to install security updates, was chosen to coincide with Patch Tuesdays. Adobe Systems' update schedule for Flash Player since November 2012 also coincides with Patch Tuesday. One of the reasons for this is that Flash Player comes as part of Windows starting with Windows 8 and Flash Player updates for the built-in and the plugin based version both need to be published at the same time in order to prevent reverse-engineering threats. Oracle's quarterly updates coincide with Patch Tuesday.

== Bandwidth impact ==
Windows Update uses the Background Intelligent Transfer Service (BITS) to download the updates, using idle network bandwidth. However BITS will use the speed as reported by the network interface (NIC) to calculate bandwidth. This can lead to bandwidth calculation errors, for example when a fast network adapter (e.g., 10 Mbit/s) is connected to the network via a slow link (e.g., 56 kbit/s) – according to Microsoft "BITS will compete for the full bandwidth [of the NIC] ... BITS has no visibility of the network traffic beyond the client."

Furthermore, the Windows Update servers of Microsoft do not honor the TCP's slow start congestion control strategy. As a result, other users on the same network may experience significantly slower connections from machines actively retrieving updates. This can be particularly noticeable in environments where many machines individually retrieve updates over a shared, bandwidth-constrained link such as those found in many multi-PC homes and small to medium-sized businesses. Bandwidth demands of patching large numbers of computers can be reduced by deploying Windows Server Update Services (WSUS) to distribute the updates locally.

In addition to updates being downloaded from Microsoft servers, Windows 10 devices can "share" updates in a peer-to-peer fashion with other Windows 10 devices on the local network, or even with Windows 10 devices on the internet. This can potentially distribute updates faster while reducing usage for networks with a metered connection.

== See also ==
- History of Microsoft Windows
- Full disclosure (computer security)
