= Windows Imaging Format =

Disk file format

- Filename extension: .wim, .swm, .esd
- Internet media type: application/x-ms-wim
- Magic number: MSWIM\0\0\0 / WLPWM\0\0\0 for wimlib pipable variant
- Developed by: Microsoft
- Type of format: Disk image

The Windows Imaging Format (WIM) is a file-based disk image format. It was developed by Microsoft to help deploy Windows Vista and subsequent versions of the Windows operating system family.

== Design ==
Like other disk image formats, a WIM file contains a set of files and associated filesystem metadata. However, unlike sector-based formats (such as ISO or VHD), WIM is file-based: the fundamental unit of information in a WIM is a file.

The primary advantages of being file-based is hardware independence and single-instance storage of a file referenced multiple times in the filesystem tree. Since the files are stored inside a single WIM file, the overhead of opening and closing many individual files is reduced. The cost of reading or writing many thousands of individual files on the local disk is negated by hardware and software-based disk caching as well as sequential reading and writing of the data.

WIM files can contain multiple disk images, which are referenced either by their numerical index or by their unique name. Due to the use of single-instance storage, the more each successive disk image has in common with previous images added to the WIM file, the less new data will be added. A WIM can also be split (spanned) into multiple parts, which have the .swm extension.

WIM images can be made bootable and Windows boot loader supports booting Windows from a WIM file. Windows Setup DVD in Windows Vista and later use such WIM files. In this case, BOOT.WIM contains a bootable version of Windows PE from which the installation is performed. Other setup files are held in the INSTALL.WIM.

Since Windows 8.1, the size of Windows directory can be reduced by moving system files into compressed WIM images stored on a separate hidden partition (WIMBoot). Since Windows 10, system files can be compressed on the system disk (CompactOS).

WIM supports three families of LZ77-based compression algorithms in ascending ratio and descending speed: XPRESS, LZX, and LZMS. The former two use Huffman encoding, while the latter uses adaptive Huffman encoding with range coding. There is also support for solid compression. Both solid compression and LZMS are introduced more recently, in WIMGAPI from Windows 8 and DISM from Windows 8.1.

WIM uses SHA-1 algorithm to calculate checksum for whole archive.

== Tools ==
=== ImageX ===
ImageX is the command-line tool used to create, edit and deploy Windows disk images in the Windows Imaging Format. Along with the underlying Windows Imaging Interface library (WIMGAPI), it is distributed as part of the free Windows Automated Installation Kit (WAIK/OPK). Starting with Windows Vista, Windows Setup uses the WAIK API to install Windows.

The first distributed prototype of ImageX was built 6.0.4007.0 (main.030212-2037). It allowed Microsoft OEM partners to experiment with the imaging technology and was developed in parallel with Longhorn alpha prototypes. It was first introduced in Milestone 4 into the Longhorn project and used in later builds of Longhorn. Build 6.0.5384.4 added significant advantages over previous versions, like read-only and read/write folder mounting capabilities, splitting to multiple image files (SWM), a WIM filter driver and the latest compression algorithms. It has been used since pre-RC (release candidates) of Windows Vista.

=== DISM ===
Deployment Image Service and Management Tool (DISM) is a tool introduced in Windows 7 and Windows Server 2008 R2 that can perform servicing tasks on a Windows installation image, be it an online image (i.e. the one the user is running) or an offline image within a folder or WIM file. Its features include mounting and unmounting images, querying installed device drivers in an offline image, and adding a device driver to an offline image. It is now possible to repair with DISM any image using either a Windows Installation CD or Windows Update.

Before Windows Server 2012 and Windows 8, DISM had incorporated the majority of ImageX functions but not all; ImageX was still needed for image capture and applying. However, DISM deprecated ImageX in Windows 8.

Windows 8.1 added ability to apply and capture disk images, and Windows 10 extended image applying, by adding compression.

=== Support in other operating systems ===
Since April 30, 2012, an open-source library for handling the WIM format is available. This library can be used on Unix-like systems, as well as on Windows. Thanks to this project, Linux distributions now have their own imagex clone called wimlib-imagex, which allows mounting WIM images and managing them (read/write) like any other block-storage provider.

As WIM images use somewhat common compression algorithms, they can be accessed by using file archivers like 7-Zip.

For other operating systems that might not support this format, it is still possible to convert .wim images to the more commonly used ISO image using the Windows Assessment and Deployment Kit on Windows.

== See also ==
- Windows Preinstallation Environment
- System Deployment Image
- Windows To Go
