= Network Bootable Image =

Legacy format

Network Bootable Image (NBI) is a legacy format that wraps operating system images to makes it possible for Etherboot to load the images directly. NBI format is able to combine kernel, file system and various boot parameters, such as location of remote file system or server IP address, into one bootable file.
