= Remote Installation Services =

Retired Microsoft remote installation facility

RIS, Remote Installation Services is a Microsoft-supplied server that allows PXE BIOS-enabled computers to remotely execute boot environment variables.

These variables are likely computers that are on a company's (or that company's client's) network. RIS is used to create installation images of operating systems or computer configurations, which can be used to demonstrate the installation process to users whose machines have been granted access to the RIS server. This eliminates the need to use a CD-ROM for installing an operating system.

== Background ==
At boot time, a workstation that has been set to boot from PXE will issue a BOOTP request via the network. Once the request is received, the DHCP Server will supply an IP address to the machine, and the DNS server will point the client computer to the RIS server, which in turn will issue a disc boot image (often called the "OS Chooser"). Once the OS Chooser environment has been booted, the user must authenticate against the Domain Controller, and can then select a Windows image to install. The source files for each image can be customized with 3rd party utilities such as nLite to slipstream updates and service packs, apply tweaks, perform unattended installations, and include software with the operating system.

== History ==
Remote Installation Services was introduced with Windows 2000 as an optional component when installed on Windows 2000 Server. Initially, it supported only the distribution of Windows 2000 Professional, but with Service Pack 3 allowed for the remote installation of Windows 2000 Server. RIS was updated twice; once to support Windows XP, and again to support Windows Server 2003. With the release of Service Pack 2 for Windows Server 2003, RIS was replaced with Windows Deployment Services.

== Overview ==
On Windows 2003, two services are required to provide Remote Installation Services: DHCP and Remote Installation Service. The Remote Installation Server doubles as a proxy DHCP server to provide Boot Server and File name instructions to clients. Remote Installation Service utilizes UDP port 4011 to provide clients the contents of each page the OS Chooser displays. Additionally, this service can provide drivers to clients; it is often used to provide the workstation's network card driver, which is required to launch the OS Chooser and mount the share where images are stored.

== Installation Using RIS ==
RIS can be used only for clean installations and cannot be used to upgrade a previous version of Windows. A RIPrep image can contain the operating system and applications. Computers that are connected to the same network as the server, and have been enabled, automatically start the RIS sequence.

This process can be automated through what is called Remote Replication. Remote replication allows installations to be sent to a designated network share at a remote office, which can then be run by any system at that location. This allows servers to run the install automatically, eliminating the need for dedicated hardware or personnel at each facility. The primary benefit of remote replication is reduced cost and complexity of managing multi-site organizations.

== See also ==
- Windows Deployment Services
- Disk Image
- List of Microsoft Windows components
