= WinBuilder =

Live CD builder for Windows

- WinBuilder
- Original author: Nuno Brito
- Developers: Peter Schlang, Robert Kochem
- Release: 2005
- Stable release: 082 / August 14, 2011
- Written in: Borland Delphi v7
- Operating system: Microsoft Windows; ReactOS
- Platform: IA-32
- Size: 928 KB
- Type: Live CD
- License: Freeware
- Website: winbuilder.net

WinBuilder is a free application designed to build and customize boot disks (Live CDs) based on Microsoft Windows (WinPE).

== Scripts ==
Scripts are the building blocks of Live CD compiled with Winbuilder, and are used to build the core components of the Live CD for adding applications, and for configuration of a specific project. Scripts consist of a human-readable text file with the .script extension, and can contain Winbuilder scripting commands, the scripts graphical user interface, and sometimes encoded applications to be extracted when needed.

== Projects ==
A Project is a collection of Winbuilder scripts maintained for building a complete Live CD. Each project contains multiple scripts, each responsible for adding features or applications to the build.

Users may build their own projects from scratch or use one of many projects actively developed by the boot-land community. Projects can be downloaded directly using Winbuilder's built-in download manager and used as-is or further customized to meet the individual's needs.

=== Actively developed projects ===
- Gena - The Gena project provides a basis for building a PE environment using Windows XP sources and is the successor to LiveXP
- nativeEx_multiPE - Live CD/DVD / Live USB that can be built from either Windows XP, Windows 2003, Windows Vista, or Windows 7 x86 sources.
- Win7PE SE - The Win7PE SE project provides a basis for building a PE environment using Windows 7 or Windows Vista sources. A fork of Multi 7PEs.
- Win8PE SE - The Win8PE SE project provides a basis for building a PE environment using a Windows 8 source and supports both x86 and x64 architectures.
- Win8.1PE SE - The Win8.1PE SE project provides a basis for building a PE environment using a Windows 8.1 source and supports both x86 and x64 architectures.
- Win10PE SE - Live CD/DVD that can be built from Windows 10 sources and supports both x86 and x64 architectures.
- Mini-WinFE - Forensically sound WinFE project for building a PE (FE) environment for data acquisition and/or analysis in digital forensic matters.

=== Inactive Projects ===
- BartPEcore - running bartPE inside a Winbuilder environment
- BB-7PE - A Windows 7 based Rescue focused PE using bbLean as its shell.
- LiveXP - Based on nativeEx, contains a large archive of programs targeted for computer repair and administration
- Multi 7PEs (formally Win7PE) - Live CD/DVD that can be built from either Windows 7 or Windows Vista sources
- MultiPE Leopard - Live CD/DVD that can be built from either Windows 7 or Windows Vista sources.
- NativeEx - Small sized Windows XP PE boot disk (~50Mb)
- NaughtyPE - Windows XP PE boot disk with sound support and other multimedia features.
- PicoXP - Minimalistic 14 MB boot disk based on XP
- UXP - Based On Windows XP for making a multiboot CD/DVD which includes The LiveXP and WinRoot (also for customization of the CD/DVD there are other apps used such as Nlite, etc.)
- VistaPE - Based on Windows PE 2.0 (included on Windows Vista DVD and WAIK)
- VistaPE CAPI - Based on VistaPE VistaPE CAPI provides bugfixes and enhancements to the original project and support for newer Winbuilder versions.
- Win7RescuePE - Live CD/DVD based on Windows 7

All of these projects are developed and distributed freely and aim to provide an alternative to other popular Live CD distributions based on Linux such as Knoppix, Slax, Damn Small Linux, which are known for their use in rescue or administrative actions on PCs.

== Use and reception ==
Use of the software to build various customized boot disks has been covered in articles from PC Quest, PC-Welt (the German edition of PC World, which also offers some customized scripts for building disk images including additional utilities, branded as pcwVistaPE and pcwWin7PE), the Russian edition of CHIP, and by TeraByte Unlimited.

CNET editor's review found that "WinBuilder is one of the most easy-to-use boot disk creation tools in the genre," and praised it for its "novice-friendly interface", but at the same time warned that the "program expects experienced users. For the most part, boot disk applications are for experts only." The built-in Download Center was remarked because it "simplifies procuring the boot disk applications." Other features praised were "its small size, fair memory overhead, simple instructions, and robust application installation wizards."

== See also ==
- BartPE
- Windows Preinstallation Environment
- List of Microsoft Windows components#Core components
- List of Microsoft Windows components
- nLite and vLite
- Scripting
- Windows To Go
