= System Image Utility =

Mac OS X Server application

- Developer: Apple Inc.
- Stable release: 10.7.4 / 2012-05-09
- Operating system: Mac OS X, Mac OS X Server
- Type: remote administration
- Website: apple.com/server/macosx/

System Image Utility is an application for making NetBoot and other image sets to be used with Mac OS X Server. It is available as part of the server admin tools package on a disc with the server software and as a download from Apple's website. There are several third-party applications that perform similar functions.

== See also ==
- Network Image Utility
