= Project Dakota =

- Developer(s): Christopher Harris, Alek Patsouris
- Stable release: PD_0.2XPAS (Windows XP), PD_0.103AS (Server 2003) / 15 July 2008
- Operating system: Windows XP, Server 2003
- Platform: Microsoft Windows
- Available in: English
- Type: Software utility
- License: Freeware
- Website: Project Dakota Online

Project Dakota was an alternative to Microsoft's Windows Update developed by Alek Patsouris & Christopher "doc" Harris to update a Windows XP system from a CD, USB drive or network drive, without the need to use the Windows Update website.

Distribution of the program started on 1 January 2008 at 12:00AM. As of November 2012 the project website states that the project has been retired completely.

== Purpose ==
Project Dakota was designed for:

- Users that format their hard disks or reinstall Windows frequently.
- System builders / Network Administrators seeking to quickly install all updates to multiple Windows PCs.
- Security conscious users who do not wish to expose their computer to the internet.
- Users with a slow connection to the Internet who want to avoid slow download times by using a faster connection on another computer to download Project Dakota, and burn it to a CD, DVD or USB flash drive.
- Users with a small Internet usage cap who don't want to use it all on updates.
- Users who want a faster way to update Windows without having to connect to the Internet to download updates

== Media ==
Project Dakota is able to run from removable media such as CDs, DVDs and USB flash drives as well as being able to run from a Network (mapped drive) or local hard disk.

== Background Information ==
Project Dakota came about from seeing the need for a better method to update multiple school computers at once, and to keep track of the status of all computers. Project Dakota achieved this by creating text files that were uploaded to the schools server according to their hostname.

When the project was adapted for general use, the project still generated the text file, but uploaded it to an FTP server with details about the hardware and what updates were installed. Many users assumed Project Dakota was obtaining their Windows Product key, but this was not the case.

The Project was inspired by the song Dakota by the Stereophonics.

== Project history ==
=== Windows XP ===
==== Version 0.1AB ====
- Code Name: Dolphin
- First Version as a BETA copy.
- Released: 1 January 2008 at 12:00AM

==== Version 0.1CS ====
- Code Name: Strawberry Spider
- Fixes bugs in the first version and adds some updates.
- Released: 13 January 2008

==== Version 0.2XPAS ====
- Code Name: Tallawarra
- Fixes bugs, adds updates.
- Released: 15 July 2008

=== Server 2003 ===
==== Version 0.103AS ====
- Code Name: Windeyer
- First version.
- Released: 15 July 2008
