= BartPE =

Software to create a customised Windows XP

- BartPE booted from a Live CD
- Original author: Bart Lagerweij
- Platform: IA-32
- Type: Live CD
- License: Freeware but requires user to have licensed copies of Windows
- Website: nu2.nu/pebuilder/

BartPE (Bart's Preinstalled Environment) is a discontinued tool that customizes Windows XP or Windows Server 2003 into a lightweight environment, similar to Windows Preinstallation Environment, which could be run from a Live CD or Live USB drive. A BartPE system image is created using PE Builder, a freeware program created by Bart Lagerweij.

It requires a legal copy of Windows XP or Windows Server 2003. Additional applications can be included in the image using plugins.

As it often resides on a Live CD or USB drive, BartPE allows a user to boot Windows, even if a hardware or software fault has disabled the installed operating system(s) on the internal hard drive – for instance, to recover files. It can also be used to scan for and remove rootkits, computer viruses and spyware (that have infected boot files), or to reset a lost administrator password.

== Overview ==
While a bootable floppy disk can be used to help recover a failing hard disk, one major limitation on using a floppy disk that booted a standalone copy of MS-DOS was that "DOS can't handle NTFS hard-drive partitions."

BartPE is a reasonable first choice for Windows users: it is free, and it is #2 in a list of alternatives; #1 is Linux-oriented. While it can be used for running demos, it can also be used "to bring a dead PC back to life."

=== PE Builder ===
PE Builder 3.1.10a

PE Builder (also known as Bart PE Builder) is the software used to create the BartPE system images.

== Description ==
As with Windows Preinstallation Environment, BartPE operates by loading system registry files into RAM, and not writing any registry changes back to boot media. Thus, neither operating system requires an operational hard drive or network access. This also allows them to be run from non-writable media such as a CD-ROM.

Since each instance of BartPE is a new installation, the BartPE "boot" disk needs original Windows Setup files in order to operate. The Bart PE Builder application interprets and condenses files from a Windows setup CD to create the BartPE installation. It can be built from a Windows XP Pro or Home Edition CD, or from a preinstalled Windows XP version (without a CD).

Additional applications can be included in the BartPE setup through the use of "plugins". A plugin contains setup information for a specific application, so that it can be included on the media and installed along with Windows at each BartPE boot. Currently there are a few hundred plugins available in addition to the dozen-odd that are included by default with BartPE. Since BartPE represents a totally independent operating environment, the most obvious application examples involve backup, restoration, diagnosis and error-correction of systems with malfunctioning primary storage drives. Plugin programs can nominally be added to the capacity of the BartPE media.

BartPE is known to have certain incompatibilities with the Windows XP CDs shipped with most Dell PCs. The Dell versions include changes to the Windows setup files that can cause the BartPE build process to fail. Two patches are currently available to correct the known problems, one to replace SETUPREG.HIV and the other to load a standard iastor.sys.

BartPE cannot create Windows Vista or later Live DVDs.

== See also ==
- Windows PE, the official Microsoft Windows Preinstallation Environment
- WinBuilder, a free application designed to build and customize live CDs based on Windows PE
- Windows To Go
- List of live CDs
