= Windows Preinstallation Environment =

Version used for deployment and recovery

- Windows PE 10.0 (based on Windows 11), showing Windows Command Prompt, Registry Editor and Windows Task Manager
- Developer: Microsoft
- Source model: Closed source; Source-available (through Shared Source Initiative)
- Released to manufacturing: 2002; 24 years ago
- Latest release: 10.0.28000.1 / November 18, 2025; 11 months ago
- Kernel type: Hybrid
- License: Freeware
- Official website: learn.microsoft.com/windows-hardware/manufacture/desktop/winpe-intro

Windows Preinstallation Environment (also known as Windows PE and WinPE) is a lightweight version of Windows developed by Microsoft used for the deployment a Windows operating system to PCs, workstations, and servers, or troubleshooting a Windows operating system while it is offline. It is intended to replace MS-DOS boot disks and can be booted via USB flash drive, PXE, iPXE, CD, DVD, hard drive, or solid-state drive. Traditionally used by large corporations and OEMs (to preinstall Windows client operating systems on PCs during manufacturing), it is now widely available free of charge via Windows Assessment and Deployment Kit (WADK) (formerly Windows Automated Installation Kit, WAIK).

== Overview ==
Windows PE was originally intended to be used only as a pre-installation platform for deploying Microsoft Windows operating systems, specifically to replace MS-DOS in this respect. WinPE has the following uses:

- Deployment of workstations and servers in large corporations as well as pre-installation by system builders of workstations and servers to be sold to end users.
- Recovery platform to run 32-bit or 64-bit recovery tools such as Winternals ERD Commander (now known as Microsoft DaRT) or Windows Recovery Environment (Windows RE).
- Platform for running third-party 32-bit or 64-bit disk cloning utilities.

The package can be used for developer testing or as a recovery CD/DVD for system administrators. Many customized WinPE boot CDs packaged with third-party applications for different uses are now available from volunteers via the Internet. The package can also be used as the base of a computer forensics investigation to either capture a disk image or run analysis tools without mounting any available disks and thus changing state.

Version 2.0 introduced a number of improvements and extended the availability of WinPE to all customers, not just corporate enterprise customers by downloading and installing Microsoft's Windows Automated Installation Kit (WAIK).

It was originally designed and built by a small team of engineers in Microsoft's Windows Deployment team, including Vijay Jayaseelan, Ryan Burkhardt, and Richard Bond.

== Versions ==
The following versions are known to exist:

Version	Description
1.0	The first release of Windows Preinstallation Environment, built from Windows XP RTM
1.1	Built from Windows XP SP1
1.2	Built from Windows Server 2003 RTM
1.5	Built from Windows XP SP2
1.6	Built from Windows Server 2003 SP1
2.0	Built from the first edition of Windows Vista. This version differs from the other versions since it doesn't need the disc to load all the files. This means that the download is now 992 MB in size instead of 60 MB from the previous versions. It's possible to modify the default startup disc to have access to a few plug-ins like Windows Management Instrumentation, Windows Scripting Host, additional drivers and other 32-bit applications (or 64-bit applications for 64-bit versions). Other new features include the capability for a small rewritable RAM disk (boot.sdi), in contrast WinPE version 1.x only has a large RAM disk (ramdisk.sdi), and the WIM format was introduced.
2.1	Built from Windows Server 2008
2.2	Built from Windows Server 2008 SP2
3.0	Built from Windows 7 code base. It is included in WAIK 2.0.
3.1	Built from Windows 7 SP1 code base. It is included in a WAIK supplementary update provided by Microsoft.
4.0	Built from Windows 8 code base. It is included in WADK for Windows 8.
5.0	Built from Windows 8.1 code base. It is included in Windows ADK for Windows 8.1.
5.1	It is an update for version 5.0 that is applied manually.
10.0.10240.16384	Built from Windows 10 code base. It is included in Windows ADK for Windows 10.
10.0.10586.0	Built from Windows 10, version 1511 code base. It is included in Windows ADK for Windows 10, version 1511.
10.0.14393.0	Built from Windows 10, version 1607 code base. It is included in Windows ADK for Windows 10, version 1607.
10.0.15063.0	Built from Windows 10, version 1703 code base.
10.0.16299.15	Built from Windows 10, version 1709 code base. First version supporting ARM32 and ARM64 architecture.
10.0.17134.1	Built from Windows 10, version 1803 code base.
10.0.17763.1	Built from Windows 10, version 1809 code base.
10.0.18362.1	Built from Windows 10, version 1903 code base.
10.0.19041.1	Built from Windows 10, version 2004 code base.
10.0.20348.1	Built from Windows Server 2022 code base.
10.0.22000.1	Built from Windows 11 code base. Last version supporting x86 and ARM32 architecture.
10.0.22621.1	Built from Windows 11, version 22H2 code base.
10.0.25398.1	Built from Windows Server, version 23H2 code base.
10.0.26100.1	Built from Windows 11, version 24H2 code base.
10.0.28000.1	Built from Windows 11, version 26H1 code base.

== Derivatives ==
=== Windows Recovery Environment ===
System Recovery Options in Windows 7

Windows 11 Recovery Environment, Advanced Options section screen, showing six of the seven available options (System image recovery is shown when the "See more recovery options" button is clicked.)

Windows Recovery Environment (WinRE) is a set of tools based on Windows PE to help diagnose and recover from serious errors which may be preventing Windows from booting successfully. Windows RE is installed alongside Windows Vista and later, and may be booted from hard disks, solid-state disks, optical media (such as an operating system installation disc), USB flash drives, and PXE (e.g. Windows Deployment Services). A copy of Windows RE is included in the installation media of the aforementioned operating systems. It is a successor to the Recovery Console.

==== Features ====
Windows RE features include:

- Automatic Repair: Automatically finds and fixes boot errors in the Windows Vista Startup Process caused by issues such as corruption of the following components: Boot Configuration Data, disk and file system metadata, Master Boot Record, or Windows Registry, and issues caused by missing or damaged boot and system files, incompatible drivers, or damaged hardware. Prior to Windows 8, this mode was known as "Startup Repair." The executable image for Automatic Repair is startrep.exe.
- System Restore: Same as the System Restore that is included in Windows, it allows a system's settings to be restored to those of a previous state.
- System Image Recovery: Same as the Backup and Restore component of Windows, it allows restoring a previously created disk image.
- Windows Memory Diagnostic Tool: Analyses the computer memory (RAM) for defects (not available on Windows 8 and later). The program does not run inside WinRE, but instead reboots the system and executes memtest.exe instead of loading the operating system. memtest.exe cannot be run inside Windows.
- Windows Command Prompt: Gives command-line access to the file system, volumes and files. It can be used to run System File Checker (sfc /scannow) against an offline Windows installation and repair missing or corrupt files. Tools like robocopy, diskpart and DISM can be used to perform various system tasks like recovering or backing up files, managing partitions, and fix servicing-related issues respectively. In order to use the command prompt, the user must sign into an administrator account.

Starting with Windows Server 2012/Windows 8, the following additional options are added:

- "Refresh" or "Reset": Both re-install Windows from a copy of the operating system on the hard drive. The "Refresh" operation maintains files, settings, and Windows Store apps (but not other programs), while "Reset" performs a factory reset of Windows, optionally formatting the hard drive and performing disk wiping. The Reset function does not perform a full reinstall; it merely performs a factory reset from a WIM image inside a hidden recovery partition. It is possible to create a custom WIM image based on which a Reset is performed.
- Startup Settings: Enforces a series of safe settings during the startup.

Windows 10 adds the following:

- Restore factory settings: Allows users who upgraded to Windows 10 to revert to their original operating system. Appears as Recover from the cloud on devices whose factory settings include Windows 10.
- Go back to the previous build: Windows 10 is an operating system for which Microsoft occasionally releases newer builds. In the event that installation of a new build of Windows 10 becomes problematic, this option allows the user to revert to the previous build. Only appears if the previous build's files are not deleted.

Windows 11 adds the following:

- Quick Machine Recovery: This is a variant of Automatic Repair, with the additional capabilities of Windows Recovery Environment being able to look for boot problem solutions via Windows Update. This option replaces Startup Repair if turned on, starting with 24H2, build 26100.4770. Enabled and shown by default for Windows 11 Home devices.

Volumes encrypted with Bitlocker can be mounted if a recovery key is available.

Windows Recovery Environment can also be installed to a hard drive partition by OEMs, and customized with additional tools such as a separate system recovery tool for restoring the computer back to its original state. As of Windows Vista SP1, users can create their own bootable CD containing the recovery environment.

==== REAgentC ====
REAgentC
- Developer: Microsoft
- Operating system: Microsoft Windows
- Type: Command
- Website: docs.microsoft.com/en-us/windows-hardware/manufacture/desktop/reagentc-command-line-options

Windows includes the REAgentC command which is used to configure a Windows RE boot image and a push-button reset recovery image. It allows administration of recovery options and various customizations. The REAgentC tool can either be used on an offline Windows image or on a running Windows system. The command requires administrator privileges.

=== Microsoft DaRT ===
Microsoft Diagnostics and Recovery Toolset (DaRT), sold as a part of Microsoft Desktop Optimization Pack, is yet another toolset based on Windows PE that performs diagnostic and recovery on an offline copy of Windows. It can manage files, edit Windows Registry, uninstall previously installed Windows updates, scan system for malware and restore deleted files. There is currently no Windows 11 version of Microsoft DaRT. It is currently unknown if there will be a DaRT11, or that DaRT will just stay on Windows 10.

== See also ==
- Live CD

=== Related software ===
- BartPE
- nLite and vLite
- WinBuilder
- Windows To Go
