= Trivial File Transfer Protocol =

Very basic transfer protocol over UDP

- Communication protocol
- Abbreviation: TFTP
- Purpose: File transfer
- Developer: Karen R. Sollins
- Introduction: June 1981; 45 years ago
- Port: 69/UDP
- RFC: 1350

The Trivial File Transfer Protocol (TFTP) is a simple communication protocol for transmitting or receiving files in a client-server application. A primary use of TFTP is in the early stages of nodes booting on a local area network when the operating system or firmware images are stored on a file server.

TFTP was first standardized in 1981 and updated in RFC 1350.

== Overview ==
Due to its simple design, TFTP can be easily implemented by code with a small memory footprint. It is, therefore, the protocol of choice for the initial stages of any network booting strategy like BOOTP, PXE, BSDP, etc., when targeting from highly resourced computers to very low resourced Single-board computers (SBC) and System on a Chip (SoC). It is also used to transfer firmware images and configuration files to network appliances like routers, firewalls, IP phones, etc. Today, TFTP is virtually unused for Internet transfers.

TFTP's design was influenced by the earlier protocol EFTP, which was part of the PARC Universal Packet protocol suite. TFTP was first defined in 1980 by IEN 133. In June 1981, the TFTP Protocol (Revision 2) was published as RFC 783 and later updated in July 1992 by RFC 1350, which fixed, among other things, the Sorcerer's Apprentice syndrome. In March 1995 the TFTP Option Extension RFC 1782 updated later in May 1998 by RFC 2347, defined the option negotiation mechanism, which establishes the framework for file transfer options to be negotiated prior to the transfer using a mechanism that is consistent with TFTP's original specification.

TFTP is a simple protocol for transferring files, implemented on top of the UDP/IP protocols using well-known port number 69. TFTP was designed to be small and easy to implement, and therefore it lacks most of the advanced features offered by more robust file transfer protocols. TFTP only reads and writes files from or to a remote server. It cannot list, delete, or rename files or directories and it has no provisions for user authentication. Today TFTP is generally only used on local area networks (LAN).

== Operation ==
A visual explanation of the TFTP protocol

A TFTP transfer is initiated by the client issuing a request to read or write a particular file on the server. The request can optionally include a set of negotiated transfer parameters proposed by the client as specified by RFC 2347 and may specify a block size as specified by RFC 2348.

If the server grants the request, the file is sent in fixed-length blocks (512 bytes unless otherwise specified). Each block of transferred data, which is usually carried within a single IP packet in order to avoid IP fragmentation, must be acknowledged by the client before the next block can be sent. A data packet of less than 512 bytes or the agreed blocksize option signals the termination of a transfer.

If a packet gets lost in the network, the intended recipient will time out and may retransmit their last packet (which may be data or an acknowledgment), thus causing the sender of the lost packet to retransmit that lost packet.

TFTP defines three modes of transfer: "Netascii", which is a modified form of the ASCII character set with modifications similar to that of the Telnet protocol, "Octet", which consists of arbitrary binary data, and "Mail", which involves Netascii characters sent to an email address rather than a file. The latter mode of transfer has since been labelled obsolete.

TFTP uses the User Datagram Protocol (UDP) at the transport layer. A transfer request is always initiated targeting port 69, but the data transfer ports are chosen independently by the sender and receiver during the transfer initialization. The ports are chosen at random according to the parameters of the networking stack, typically from the range of ephemeral ports.

The original protocol has a transfer file size limit of 65535 blocks, or 32 MB. With RFC 2348 allowing for block sizes of up to 65535 bytes, the maximum size increased to 4 GB. Some servers and clients support block number roll-over, where the block counter resets after passing the 65535 block limit. Although non-standard, this allows for theoretically unlimited transfer file size.

Due to requiring a successful round trip per block, TFTP provides low throughput especially over high latency links. In January 2015 TFTP RFC 7440 was published, which introduces a strategy where a larger amount of uninterrupted data blocks are sent before waiting for the acknowledgement, called "windowing". This substantially improves performance for use cases such as PXE booting, as an alternative to increasing the block size, which is limited by the risk of IP fragmentation.

== Usage ==
TFTP has typically been associated with network booting. One of the first applications was bootstrap loading using the TFTP standard RFC 906, published in 1984, which established Trivial File Transfer Protocol as the file transfer protocol for bootstrap loading.

The Preboot Execution Environment (PXE) version 2.0 was released in December 1998, and the update 2.1 was made public in September 1999, counting on TFTP as its file transfer protocol. Intel has recently decided to widely support PXE within the new UEFI specification, extending the TFTP support to all EFI/UEFI environments.

== Security considerations ==
TFTP provides no built-in security mechanisms. Care must be taken in the rights granted to a TFTP server process so as not to violate the security of the server's file system. As such, it is often installed with controls such that only files that have public read access are available via TFTP. Additionally, listing, deleting, renaming, and writing files via TFTP is not supported. TFTP file transfers are not recommended where the inherent protocol limitations could raise insurmountable liability concerns.

== IETF standards documentation ==
RFC Number	Title	Published	Author	Obsolete and Update Information
RFC 783	The TFTP Protocol (Revision 1)	June 1981	K. Sollins	Obsoleted by - RFC 1350
RFC 906	Bootstrap Loading using TFTP	June 1984	Ross Finlayson	—
RFC 951	Bootstrap Protocol	Sep.1985	Bill Croft	Updated by RFC 1395, 1497, 1532, 1542, 5494
RFC 1350	The TFTP Protocol (Revision 2)	July 1992	K. Sollins	Updated by RFC 1782, 1783, 1784, 1785, 2347, 2348, 2349
RFC 1782	TFTP Option Extension	March 1995	G. Malkin	Obsoleted by - RFC 2347
RFC 2090	TFTP Multicast Option	February 1997	A. Emberson	Experimental
RFC 2131	Dynamic Host Configuration Protocol	March 1997	R. Droms	Updated by RFC 3396, 4361, 5494, 6842
RFC 2347	TFTP Option Extension	May 1998	G. Malkin	—
RFC 2348	TFTP Blocksize Option	May 1998	G. Malkin	—
RFC 2349	TFTP Timeout Interval and Transfer Size Options	May 1998	G. Malkin	—
RFC 5505	Principles of Internet Host Configuration	May 2009	B. Aboba	—
RFC 7440	TFTP Windowsize Option	Jan 2015	P. Masotta	—

== See also ==
- Simple File Transfer Protocol
