= Microsoft Knowledge Base =

On-line technical support repository

Microsoft Knowledge Base (MSKB) was a website repository of over 150,000 articles made available to the public by Microsoft Corporation for technical support. It contained information on many problems encountered by users of Microsoft products. Each article bore an ID number and articles were often referred to by their Knowledge Base (KB) ID. Microsoft Windows update names typically start with the letters "KB", in reference to the specific article on that issue. Previously, the letter "Q" was used.

As of 2020, Microsoft began to discontinue the Knowledge Base service. Some content was migrated to the learn.microsoft.com sub-site.

URL of particular KB article with number had one of those format:

- http://support.microsoft.com/default.aspx?scid=kb;en-us;Qnumber
- http://support.microsoft.com/default.aspx?scid=kb;en-us;number
- http://support.microsoft.com/kb/KBnumber
- http://support.microsoft.com/kb/qnumber
- http://support.microsoft.com/kb/number

and lot of KB articles are archived on the Wayback Machine.

kbalertz.com was a website that provided email alerts of new articles, although Microsoft had also provided a similar service.

Updates and patches are named using the Microsoft KB numbers of the corresponding Microsoft Knowledge Base article. The KB numbers do not contain any decipherable information and are assigned sequentially and uniquely. This means that a higher number indicates a more recent release date.

== See also ==
- MSDN Library
- Windows Update
