= User State Migration Tool =

Command line utility program developed by Microsoft

User State Migration Tool (USMT)
- Developer: Microsoft
- Stable release: 5.0
- Operating system: Microsoft Windows
- Type: Command
- License: Proprietary commercial software
- Website: docs.microsoft.com/en-us/windows/deployment/usmt/usmt-technical-reference

The User State Migration Tool (USMT) is a command line utility program developed by Microsoft that allows users comfortable with scripting languages to transfer files and settings between Windows PCs. This task is also performed by Windows Easy Transfer, which was designed for general users but then discontinued with the release of Windows 10, where they instead partnered with Laplink. Starting with Windows 8, many settings and data are now being synchronized in cloud services via a Microsoft Account and OneDrive. USMT allows a high-volume, automated deployment of files and settings, and is also useful in migrating user settings and files during OS upgrades. Because USMT has high complexity and a command line interface, there have been several attempts to provide access to its useful functionality by creating GUI wrappers for it. 32-bit to 64-bit migrations are supported, but 64-bit to 32-bit are not.

USMT 4 is included in the Windows Automated Installation Kit. USMT 5 is included in the Windows Assessment and Deployment Kit (ADK). Versions of the USMT are included in the Windows ADKs for Windows 10 and 11.

== Overview ==
USMT consists of two separate programs. Scanstate.exe scans the source PC for the data and settings and stores it in a .MIG file. Loadstate migrates the data and settings from the .MIG file onto the target PC.

What to transfer is specified as commandline switches in the configuration XML files migapp.xml, migsys.xml, miguser.xml and other optional Config.xml files. Which Users (and their data) to transfer is controlled by other switches.

An example of a "load data on to PC" command could look like this (in one line – newlines and indents added here for readability):

loadstate "Y:\temp\Migrationstorage\WS_toolshop1"
          /i:"Y:\temp\Migrationstorage\WS_toolshop1\migapp.xml"
          "Y:\temp\Migrationstorage\WS_toolshop1\migsys.xml"
          /i:"Y:\temp\Migrationstorage\WS_toolshop1\miguser.xml"
          /ue:*\* /ui:gutte /ui:Lotta /lac /lae
          /progress:"C:\Documents and Settings\Administrator\Local Settings\Temp\USMTprog.log"
          /l:"C:\Documents and Settings\Administrator\Local Settings\Temp\USMTscan.log"..
          /c

The "Scanstate" command is similar in complexity. Both commands require strict adherence to syntax.

== Supported OSes ==
Source operating systems
Version	98	NT 4.0	2000 (Note: Versions that cover Windows 2000 only cover the Professional edition)	XP	Vista	7	8	8.1	10	11	Cite
2 (Note: This version supports 32-bit operating systems only)	Yes	Yes	Yes	Yes	No	No	No	No	No	No	
3	No	No	Yes	Yes	Yes	No	No	No	No	No	
4	No	No	No	Yes (Note: Service Pack 3 only)	Yes (Note: Service Pack 1 only)	Yes	No	No	No	No	
5	No	No	No	Yes	Yes	Yes	Yes	No	No	No	
6.1	No	No	No	No	No	Yes	Yes	Yes	No	No	
10	No	No	No	No	No	Yes	Yes	Yes	Yes		
29Jan2025	No	No	No	No	No	Yes	Yes	Yes	Yes	Yes	

Destination operating systems
Version	2000	XP	Vista	7	8	8.1	10	11	Cite
2	Yes	Yes	No	No	No	No	No	No	
3	No	Yes	Yes	No	No	No	No	No	
4	No	No	Yes	Yes	No	No	No	No	
5	No	No	Yes	Yes	Yes	No	No	No	
6.1	No	No	No	Yes	Yes	Yes	No	No	
10	No	No	No	Yes	Yes	Yes	Yes		
29Jan2025	No	No	No	No	No	No	Yes	Yes	

== What USMT transfers ==
USMT transfers

- Selected User Accounts
- Files and folders
- E-mail messages, settings, and contacts
- Photos, music, and videos
- Windows settings
- Program data files and settings
- Internet settings

== GUI wrappers for USMT ==
Because of the complexity of USMT command-line input, there have been third-party attempts to create GUI front-ends for it. These include (but are not limited to):

- Workstation Migration Assistant (open-source with source code posted on GitHub)
- Super Grate (focus on remote migration: open-source with source code posted on GitHub)
- M.U.S.T. - Move User's Stuff Tool (free USMT GUI that encapsulates most features of USMT4 plus more)
- USMT XML Builder (focus on editing USMT XML template files)
- USMTGUI (Use advanced USMT features - simply. A "one window GUI" for USMT.)

Both Workstation Migration Assistant and USMT XML Builder are out of date but there are up to date commercial GUI's for USMT.
