= Windows Assessment and Deployment Kit =

Collection of tools and technologies by Microsoft

- Developer: Microsoft
- Release: 13 February 2007; 19 years ago
- Stable release: for Windows 11, v.24H2 / May 2024; 2 years ago
- Operating system: Windows Vista and later
- Platform: IA-32, x64, ARM64
- Size: 32 MB ~ 3.48 GB
- Available in: Arabic, Chinese Simplified, Chinese Traditional, Czech, Danish, Dutch, English, Finnish, French, German, Greek, Hebrew, Hungarian, Italian, Japanese, Korean, Norwegian, Polish, Portuguese, Spanish, Swedish and Turkish
- Type: Utility software
- License: Freeware
- Website: learn.microsoft.com/en-us/windows-hardware/get-started/adk-install

Windows Assessment and Deployment Kit (Windows ADK), formerly Windows Automated Installation Kit (Windows AIK or WAIK), is a collection of tools and technologies produced by Microsoft designed to help deploy Microsoft Windows operating system images to target computers or to a virtual hard disk image in VHD format. It was first introduced with Windows Vista. WAIK is a required component of Microsoft Deployment Toolkit.

== History ==
Windows AIK Version 1.0 was released with Windows Vista. New or redesigned tools and technologies included Windows System Image Manager (Windows SIM), Sysprep, ImageX, and Windows Preinstallation Environment (WinPE) v2.0.

Windows AIK Version 1.1 was released with Windows Vista SP1 and Windows Server 2008. A number of new tools were introduced, including PostReflect and VSP1Cln. Windows PE 2.1 could be more customized. Supported operating systems include Windows Server 2008, Windows Vista, Windows Server 2003 SP1, Windows Server 2003 SP2 and Windows XP SP2.

Windows AIK Version 2.0 was released with Windows 7 beta. Significantly, a single new tool, DISM, replaced several earlier tools including PEImg and IntlCfg, which were deprecated. User State Migration Tool (USMT) was added to this version of WAIK. Supported operating systems include Windows Server 2003 R2 SP2, Windows Vista SP1, Windows Server 2008, Windows 7 and Windows Server 2008 R2.

Windows AIK version 3.0 is exactly the same as 2.0; the version number has only been updated to correspond with the release of Service Pack 1 for Windows 7. Microsoft has also released a WAIK supplement for Windows 7 SP1. WAIK readme references the WAIK supplement, which optionally adds Windows PE v3.1 to a previously installed, compatible WAIK. Sysprep is included with the operating system rather than included in WAIK.

AIK was renamed to the Windows Assessment and Deployment Kit (ADK) with Windows 8, and includes Windows OEM Preinstallation Kit. ImageX was removed from this version, as DISM fully replaced its features.

Since Windows 10 version 1607, the ADK was included the Windows Configuration Designer (WCD), which can produces PPKG files.

== Components ==
=== Application compatibility tools ===
This toolset consists of Compatibility Administrator and Standard User Analyzer.

=== DISM ===
Deployment Image Servicing and Management (DISM) is a command-line tool that can perform a large number of servicing tasks. It can query, configure, install and uninstall Windows features such as locale settings, language packs, optional components, device drivers, UWP apps, or Windows updates. DISM can perform these tasks on the live (running) Windows instance, an offline instance in another partition, or a Windows installation image inside a WIM file. Starting with Windows 8 and Windows Server 2012, it can repair damaged or corrupt Windows files by downloading a fresh copy from the Internet.

DISM has been part of Windows since Windows 7 and Windows Server 2008 R2. Before Windows Server 2012 and Windows 8, DISM had incorporated the majority of ImageX functions but not all; ImageX was still needed to capture the disk image for deployment. However, DISM deprecated ImageX in Windows 8. In addition, Windows 8 and Windows Server 2012 expose DISM services in PowerShell through 22 cmdlets for object-oriented scripting. This number has reached 62 in Windows 10 and Windows Server 2016.

=== Preinstallation environment ===
WAIK includes Windows Preinstallation Environment, a lightweight version of Windows that can be booted via PXE, CD-ROM, USB flash drive or external hard disk drive and is used to deploy, troubleshoot or recover Windows environments. It replaces MS-DOS boot disks, Emergency Repair Disk, Recovery Console and Automated System Recovery boot disks. Traditionally used by large corporations and OEMs (to preinstall Windows client operating systems to PCs during manufacturing), WinPE is now available free of charge via WAIK.

=== User state migration ===
WAIK for Windows 7 includes User State Migration Tool v4.0, a command-line interface tool for transferring Windows user settings from one installation to another as part of an operating system upgrade or wipe-and-reload recovery, for example, to clean out a rootkit. USMT v4.0 can transfer the settings from Microsoft Windows XP or later to Microsoft Windows Vista and later. Versions of the USMT are included in the Windows ADKs for Windows 10, versions 1511 and 1607.

=== Windows Assessment Toolkit ===
Described in Microsoft documents.

=== Windows Performance Toolkit ===
Described in Microsoft documents.

== Former components ==
=== ImageX ===
ImageX is the command-line tool used to create, edit and deploy Windows disk images in the Windows Imaging Format. Starting with Windows Vista, Windows Setup uses the WAIK API to install Windows.

The first distributed prototype of ImageX was build 6.0.4007.0 (main.030212-2037). It allowed Microsoft OEM partners to experiment with the imaging technology and was developed in parallel with Longhorn alpha prototypes. It was first introduced in Milestone 4 into the Longhorn project, and used in later builds of Longhorn. Build 6.0.5384.4 (Beta 2) added significant advantages over previous versions, like read-only and read/write folder mounting capabilities, splitting to multiple image files (SWM), a WIM filter driver and the latest LZX compression algorithms. It has been used since pre-RC (release candidates) of Windows Vista.
