= Bootstrap Protocol =

Computer networking protocol

The Bootstrap Protocol (BOOTP) is a computer networking protocol used in Internet Protocol networks to automatically assign an IP address to network devices from a configuration server. The BOOTP was originally defined in RFC 951 published in 1985.

While some parts of BOOTP have been effectively superseded by the Dynamic Host Configuration Protocol (DHCP), which adds the feature of leases, parts of BOOTP are used to provide service to the DHCP protocol. Some DHCP servers also provide the legacy BOOTP functionality.

When a network-connected computer boots up, its IP stack broadcasts BOOTP network messages requesting an IP address assignment. A BOOTP configuration server replies to the request by assigning an IP address from a pool of addresses, which is preconfigured by an administrator.

BOOTP is implemented using the User Datagram Protocol (UDP) for transport. Port number 67 is used by the server for receiving client requests, and port number 68 is used by the client for receiving server responses. BOOTP operates only on IPv4 networks.

Historically, BOOTP has also been used for Unix-like diskless workstations to obtain the network location of their boot image, in addition to the IP address assignment. Enterprises used it to roll out a pre-configured client (e.g., Windows) installation to newly installed PCs.

Initially requiring the use of a boot floppy disk to establish the initial network connection, manufacturers of network interfaces later embedded the protocol in the firmware of interface cards as well as system boards with on-board network interfaces, thus allowing direct network booting.

== History ==
The BOOTP was first defined in September 1985 by Bill Croft and John Gilmore as a replacement for the Reverse Address Resolution Protocol (RARP), published in June 1984. The primary motivation for replacing RARP with BOOTP is that RARP was a link layer protocol. This made implementation difficult on many server platforms, and required that a server be present on each individual IP subnet. BOOTP introduced the innovation of relay agents, which forwarded BOOTP packets from the local network using standard IP routing, so that one central BOOTP server could serve hosts on many subnets.

An increasing set of BOOTP vendor information extensions was defined to supply BOOTP clients of relevant information about the network, like default gateway, name server IP address, the domain name, etcetera.

With the advent of the Dynamic Host Configuration Protocol, the BOOTP vendor information extensions were incorporated as DHCP option fields, to allow DHCP servers to also serve BOOTP clients.

== Operation ==
=== Case 1: Client and server on same network ===
When a BOOTP client is started, it has no IP address, so it broadcasts a message containing its MAC address onto the network. This message is called a “BOOTP request”, and it is picked up by the BOOTP server, which replies to the client with the following information that the client needs:

1. The client's IP address, subnet mask, and default gateway address.
2. The IP address and host name of the BOOTP server.
3. The IP address of the server that has the boot image, which the client needs to load its operating system.

When the client receives this information from the BOOTP server, it configures and initializes its TCP/IP protocol stack, and then connects to the server on which the boot image is shared. The client loads the boot image and uses this information to load and start its operating system.

The Dynamic Host Configuration Protocol (DHCP) was developed as an extension of BOOTP. BOOTP is defined in Requests for Comments (RFC) 951 and 1084.

=== Case 2: Client and server on different networks ===
1. Problem with the bootp request is that the request is broadcast. A broadcast IP datagram cannot pass through any router. The router discards this packet.
2. To solve this problem, there is a need for an intermediary (relay).
3. One of the host or router can be configured at application layer to operate as relay agent.
4. The relay agent knows the uni-cast address of bootp server and listens for broadcast message on port 67.
5. When it receives this broadcast packet, it encapsulates the message in unicast datagram and sends request to bootp server.
6. The packet carrying a unicast destination address is routed by any router and reaches the bootp server.
7. The relay agent, after receiving the reply, sends it to bootp client.

== IETF standards documentation ==
- B. Volz (November 2004). Reclassifying Dynamic Host Configuration Protocol version 4 (DHCPv4) Options. Network Working Group. doi:10.17487/RFC3942. RFC 3942. Proposed Standard. Updates RFC 2132.
- S. Alexander; R. Droms (March 1997). DHCP Options and BOOTP Vendor Extensions. IETF Network Working Group. doi:10.17487/RFC2132. RFC 2132. Draft Standard. Obsoletes RFC 1533. Updated by RFC 3442, 3942, 4361, 4833 and 5494.
- W. Wimer (October 1993). Clarifications and Extensions for the Bootstrap Protocol. Network Working Group. doi:10.17487/RFC1542. RFC 1542. Draft Standard. Updates RFC 951. Obsoletes RFC 1532.
- R. Droms (October 1993). Interoperation Between DHCP and BOOTP. Network Working Group. doi:10.17487/RFC1534. RFC 1534. Draft Standard.
- Bill Croft; John Gilmore (September 1985). BOOTSTRAP PROTOCOL (BOOTP). Network Working Group. doi:10.17487/RFC0951. RFC 951. Draft Standard. Updated by RFC 1395, 1497, 1532, 1542 and 5494.

== See also ==
- Preboot Execution Environment (PXE)
- Remote Initial Program Load (RIPL)
- UDP Helper Address — a tool for routing BOOTP requests across subnet boundaries
- Boot Service Discovery Protocol (BSDP)
- Maintenance Operations Protocol (MOP)
