= Comparison of distributed file systems =

In computing, a distributed file system (DFS) or network file system is any file system that allows access from multiple hosts to files shared via a computer network. This makes it possible for multiple users on multiple machines to share files and storage resources.

Distributed file systems differ in their performance, mutability of content, handling of concurrent writes, handling of permanent or temporary loss of nodes or storage, and their policy of storing content.

== Locally managed ==
=== FOSS ===
Client	Written in	License	Access API	High availability	Shards	Efficient Redundancy	Redundancy Granularity	Initial release year	Memory requirements (GB)
Alluxio (Virtual Distributed File System)	Java	Apache License 2.0	HDFS, FUSE, HTTP/REST, S3	hot standby	No	Replication	File	2013	
Ceph	C++	LGPL	librados (C, C++, Python, Ruby), S3, Swift, FUSE	Yes	Yes	Pluggable erasure codes	Pool	2010	1 per TB of storage
Coda	C	GPL	C	Yes	Yes	Replication	Volume	1987	
GlusterFS	C	GPLv3	libglusterfs, FUSE, NFS, SMB, Swift, libgfapi	mirror	Yes	Reed-Solomon	Volume	2005	
HDFS	Java	Apache License 2.0	Java and C client, HTTP, FUSE	transparent master failover	No	Reed-Solomon	File	2005	
IPFS	Go	Apache 2.0 or MIT	HTTP gateway, FUSE, Go client, Javascript client, command line tool	Yes	with IPFS Cluster	Replication	Block	2015	
LizardFS	C++	GPLv3	POSIX, FUSE, NFS-Ganesha, Ceph FSAL (via libcephfs)	master	No	Reed-Solomon	File	2013	
Lustre	C	GPLv2	POSIX, NFS-Ganesha, NFS, SMB	Yes	Yes	No redundancy	No redundancy	2003	
MinIO	Go	AGPL3.0	AWS S3 API, FTP, SFTP	Yes	Yes	Reed-Solomon	Object	2014	
MooseFS	C	GPLv2	POSIX, FUSE	master	No	Replication	File	2008	
OpenAFS	C	IBM Public License	Virtual file system, Installable File System			Replication	Volume	2000	
OpenIO	C	AGPLv3 / LGPLv3	Native (Python, C, Java), HTTP/REST, S3, Swift, FUSE (POSIX, NFS, SMB, FTP)	Yes		Pluggable erasure codes	Object	2015	0.5
Quantcast File System	C	Apache License 2.0	C++ client, FUSE (C++ server: MetaServer and ChunkServer are both in C++)	master	No	Reed-Solomon	File	2012	
RozoFS	C, Python	GPLv2	FUSE, SMB, NFS, key/value	Yes		Mojette	Volume	2011	
Tahoe-LAFS	Python	GNU GPL	HTTP (browser or CLI), SFTP, FTP, FUSE via SSHFS, pyfilesystem			Reed-Solomon	File	2007	
XtreemFS	Java, C++	BSD License	libxtreemfs (Java, C++), FUSE			Replication	File	2009	

=== Proprietary ===
Client	Written in	License	Access API
BeeGFS	C / C++	FRAUNHOFER FS (FhGFS) EULA, GPLv2 client	POSIX
Cloudian	C++	Proprietary	AWS S3, NFS, SMB/CIFS, Rest API
ObjectiveFS	C	Proprietary	POSIX, FUSE
Spectrum Scale (GPFS)	C, C++	Proprietary	POSIX, NFS, SMB, Swift, S3, HDFS
MapR-FS	C, C++	Proprietary	POSIX, NFS, FUSE, S3, HDFS, CLI
Isilon OneFS	C/C++	Proprietary	POSIX, NFS, SMB/CIFS, HDFS, HTTP, FTP, SWIFT Object, CLI, Rest API
Qumulo	C/C++	Proprietary	POSIX, NFS, SMB/CIFS, CLI, S3, Rest API
Scality	C	Proprietary	FUSE, NFS, REST, AWS S3
VaultFS	C/C++	Proprietary	POSIX, NFS, SMB/CIFS, CLI, S3, Rest API

== Remote access ==
Name	Run by	Access API
Amazon S3	Amazon.com	HTTP (REST/SOAP)
Google Cloud Storage	Google	HTTP (REST)
SWIFT (part of OpenStack)	Rackspace, Hewlett-Packard, others	HTTP (REST)
Microsoft Azure	Microsoft	HTTP (REST)
IBM Cloud Object Storage	IBM (formerly Cleversafe)	HTTP (REST)

== Comparison ==
Some researchers have made a functional and experimental analysis of several distributed file systems including HDFS, Ceph, Gluster, Lustre and old (1.6.x) version of MooseFS, although this document is from 2013 and a lot of information are outdated (e.g. MooseFS had no HA for Metadata Server at that time).

The cloud based remote distributed storage from major vendors have different APIs and different consistency models.

== See also ==
- Distributed file system
- List of file systems, the Distributed file systems section
