= EXOFS =

- Developer: Avishay Traeger
- Operating system: Linux
- Type: Distributed file system
- License: GPL
- Website: open-osd.org

EXOFS (formerly known as OSDFS) is an object-based file system implemented on top of an external object store. Its name stands for "EXtended Object File System" referring to its use of ext2-based metadata and object storage devices.

Exofs was originally developed by Avishay Traeger for IBM HRL and was originally based on the ext2 file system. Since 2008, Panasas develops and maintains Exofs on open-osd.org.

Exofs has been included in the mainline Linux kernel since version 2.6.30-rc1, but no Linux distribution implemented this with a utility for making file systems in exofs for the current kernel line. It was removed in version 5.1-rc1.

== See also ==
- Comparison of file systems
- List of file systems
