= IBRIX Fusion =

IBRIX Fusion is a parallel file system combined with a logical volume manager, availability features and a management interface. The software was produced, sold, and supported by IBRIX Incorporated of Billerica, Massachusetts. HP announced on July 17, 2009 that it had reached a definitive agreement to acquire IBRIX. Subsequent to the acquisition, the software components of IBRIX have been combined with ProLiant servers to form the X9000 series of storage systems.

The X9000 storage systems are designed to provide network-attached storage over both standard protocols (SMB, NFS, HTTP and NDMP) as well as a proprietary protocol. Architecturally, the file system is limited to 16 petabytes under a single namespace, and is based upon a design described in U.S. patent 6,782,389.

It was used in the HPE StoreOnce (former D2D) products.

== See also ==
- List of file systems
- Distributed file system
