= MObStor =

Yahoo!'s unstructured storage cloud

MObStor is Yahoo!'s unstructured storage cloud, similar in concept to Amazon's Simple Storage Service.
