= CRFS =

CRFS (Coherent Remote File System) is a network file system protocol by Zach Brown formerly of Oracle intended to leverage the Btrfs architecture to gain higher performance than existing protocols (such as NFS and SMB) and to expose Btrfs features such as snapshots to remote clients. The code is unmaintained.

If one is looking for a network file system on top of Btrfs, there are a number of options available, which are under active support and development, including Ceph, BeeGFS, GlusterFS, and Samba.

== See also ==
- Btrfs
- Ceph
- BeeGFS
- GlusterFS
