= ZipSlack =

Release of the Slackware Linux distribution

ZipSlack was a specially compiled release of the Slackware Linux distribution that was designed to be lightweight and portable. It was distributed in a ZIP archive along with the Slackware release.

== Installation ==
Installing ZipSlack required obtaining the archive and unzipping it to the place where the user wished to install it. Unlike some other programs at the time, ZipSlack did not require the user to reconfigure existing partitions to install it.

== Details ==
ZipSlack used the UMSDOS filesystem under Linux, which ran on top of the FAT filesystem. The FAT filesystem was originally used by Microsoft operating systems and can be found today on various types of removable media such as ZIP disks, SuperDisks, USB flash drives, and secure digital cards.

The last release of Slackware that contained ZipSlack was Slackware 11.0. Slackware 12.0 did not contain a ZipSlack setup within its distribution, although this change was not mentioned in its release announcement. The most likely cause of this is the lack of UMSDOS support in Linux 2.6, as support for this filesystem type had been removed from the official Linux sources after some discussion regarding the Linux Kernel Mailing List.

ZipSlack was quite lightweight compared to other operating systems in its time. For example, the X Window System was not present in ZipSlack by default, nor were there any GUI-based web browsers. However, since ZipSlack was essentially just a miniature installation of Slackware, users were able to use the Slackware package management system to install whatever packages they might need.

== Minimum requirements ==
When downloaded, ZipSlack required approximately 100 megabytes of disk space and an Intel 80386 or compatible CPU. ZipSlack was able to run with a minimum of four megabytes of memory with an add-on supplied by Slackware. However, at least eight to sixteen megabytes were the recommended minimum requirement with the possibility of more if the X Window System or other GUI software was going to be used with it.

The UMSDOS file system needed to be hosted on a FAT filesystem.

== Caveats ==
The archive, which contained the ZipSlack distribution, was too big to be decompressed with a 16-bit application. Instead, software such as a 32-bit DOS version of Info-ZIP compiled with a DOS extender, Info-ZIP on Linux, WinZip, 7-Zip, or another similarly capable utility on Microsoft Windows needed to be used. Alternatively, the system could be booted on a live CD version of Slackware and the standard zip utility provided with the distribution used.

== See also ==
- Lightweight Linux distribution
