= Chiron FS =

Chiron Filesystem is a fault-tolerant replication file system.

Chiron FS is a FUSE based filesystem that implements replication at the filesystem level like RAID 1 does at the device level. The replicated filesystem may be of any kind; the only requisite is that it is mounted.

There is no need for special configuration files; the setup is as simple as one mount command (or one line in fstab). There is no specific communication protocol, at mount time the invoking parameters indicate two or more paths to directories which will be the replicated underlying filesystems (they must be already in sync). This allows the client to use any kind of underlying filesystems such as Ext3, NFS or SSHFS and even mix them. Every write in the Chiron FS mount point subtree will be echoed to the underlying filesystems. Any read from Chiron FS mount point subtree will be made from only one of the underlying filesystems using a prioritized round robin algorithm.

If one or more underlying filesystems fails, the virtualized filesystem provided by Chiron FS continues operating as long as there is at least one replica available. In this case, the failures are reported to a log file. If the failure is on a write operation, the failed replica is disabled and it is not used by Chiron FS until it is available and resynchronized with the others. Synchronization is not implemented yet in Chiron FS, so it must be done manually. If all replica fails then the calling application receives the error message as it would receive if it was accessing a non replicated filesystem. In this case there will be no log report.

== See also ==
- List of file systems
