= Nasan =

The Nasan Clustered File System is a shared disk file system created by the company DataPlow. Nasan software enables high-speed access to shared files located on shared, storage area network (SAN)-attached storage devices by utilizing the high-performance, scalable data transfers inherent to storage area networks and the manageability of network attached storage (NAS).

Nasan derives its name from the combination of network attached storage (NAS) and storage area network (SAN). Nasan clustered file sharing is an extension of traditional LAN file sharing yet utilizes storage area networks for data transfers. Deploying a Nasan cluster entails configuring LAN file sharing, installing Nasan file system software, and connecting computers and storage devices to the SAN.

== Platforms ==
Supports Linux and Solaris operating systems.

Supports all SAN-based, block-level storage protocols including Fibre Channel and iSCSI.
