= ObjectiveFS =

Distributed file system

- Stable release: 3.1 / April 20, 2015
- Operating system: Linux, Mac OS X
- Type: Distributed file system
- License: proprietary
- Website: ObjectiveFS.com

ObjectiveFS is a distributed file system developed by Objective Security Corp. It is a POSIX-compliant file system built with an object store backend. It was initially released with AWS S3 backend, and has later implemented support for Google Cloud Storage and object store devices. It was released for beta in early 2013, and the first version was officially released on August 11, 2013.

== Design ==
ObjectiveFS implements a log structured file system on top of object stores (such as Amazon S3, Google Cloud Storage and other object store devices). It is a POSIX compliant file system and supports features such as dynamic file system size, soft and hard links, unix attributes, extended attributes, Unix timestamps, users and permissions, no limit on file size, atomic renames, atomic file creation, directory renames, read and write anywhere in a file, named pipes, sockets, etc.

It implements client-side encryption and uses the NaCl crypto library, with algorithms like Salsa20 and Poly1305. This approach doesn't have data-dependent branches or data-dependency array indices and protects against cache timing attacks. Data is encrypted before leaving the client, and stays encrypted at rest and in motion.

One main difference between ObjectiveFS and GlusterFS/CephFS is that it offloads the storage cluster management to cloud providers (Amazon/Google).

== Usage ==
ObjectiveFS software runs on the server and talks to the object store using S3 API. The software itself handles the metadata. When there are multiple servers sharing the same files, it handles the negotiation with other sharing servers (also running ObjectiveFS).

Some use cases are scaling web servers, mail servers, content management services (CMS), hybrid cloud., hybrid development environment between laptop and cloud

== See also ==
- Distributed file system
- List of file systems, the distributed fault-tolerant file system section
- Ceph
- Lustre
- GlusterFS
