= Lnfs =

lnfs is a Plan 9 file system enabling use of long filenames on filesystems which do not support them. Similar to the UMSDOS file system for Linux.
