= Tahoe-LAFS =

File system

- Release: 2 May 2007
- Stable release: 1.20.0 / 19 December 2024; 22 months ago
- Written in: Python
- Operating system: Cross-platform
- Available in: English
- Type: Cloud computing
- License: Choice of GNU GPL 2+ and a custom open source licence with a grace period
- Website: tahoe-lafs.org
- Repository: tahoe-lafs.org/trac/tahoe-lafs/browser

Tahoe-LAFS (Tahoe Least-Authority File Store) is a free and open, secure, decentralized, fault-tolerant, distributed data store and distributed file system. It can be used as an online backup system, or to serve as a file or Web host similar to Freenet, depending on the front-end used to insert and access files in the Tahoe system. Tahoe can also be used in a RAID-like fashion using multiple disks to make a single large Redundant Array of Inexpensive Nodes (RAIN) pool of reliable data storage.

The system is designed and implemented around the "principle of least authority" (POLA), described by Brian Warner (one of the project's original founders) as the idea "that any component of the system should have as little power of authority as it needs to get its job done". Strict adherence to this convention is enabled by the use of cryptographic capabilities that provide the minimum set of privileges necessary to perform a given task by asking agents. A RAIN array acts as a storage volume; these servers do not need to be trusted by confidentiality or integrity of the stored data.

== History ==
Tahoe-LAFS was started in 2006 at online backup services company All My Data and has been actively developed since 2007. In 2008, Brian Warner and Zooko Wilcox-O'Hearn published a paper on Tahoe at the 4th ACM international workshop on Storage security and survivability.

When All My Data closed in 2009, Tahoe-LAFS became a free software project under the GNU General Public License or The Transitive Grace License, which allows owners of the code twelve months to profit from their work before releasing it. In 2010, Tahoe-LAFS was mentioned as a tool against censorship by the Electronic Frontier Foundation. In 2013, it was one of the hackathon projects at the GNU 30th anniversary.

== Functionality ==
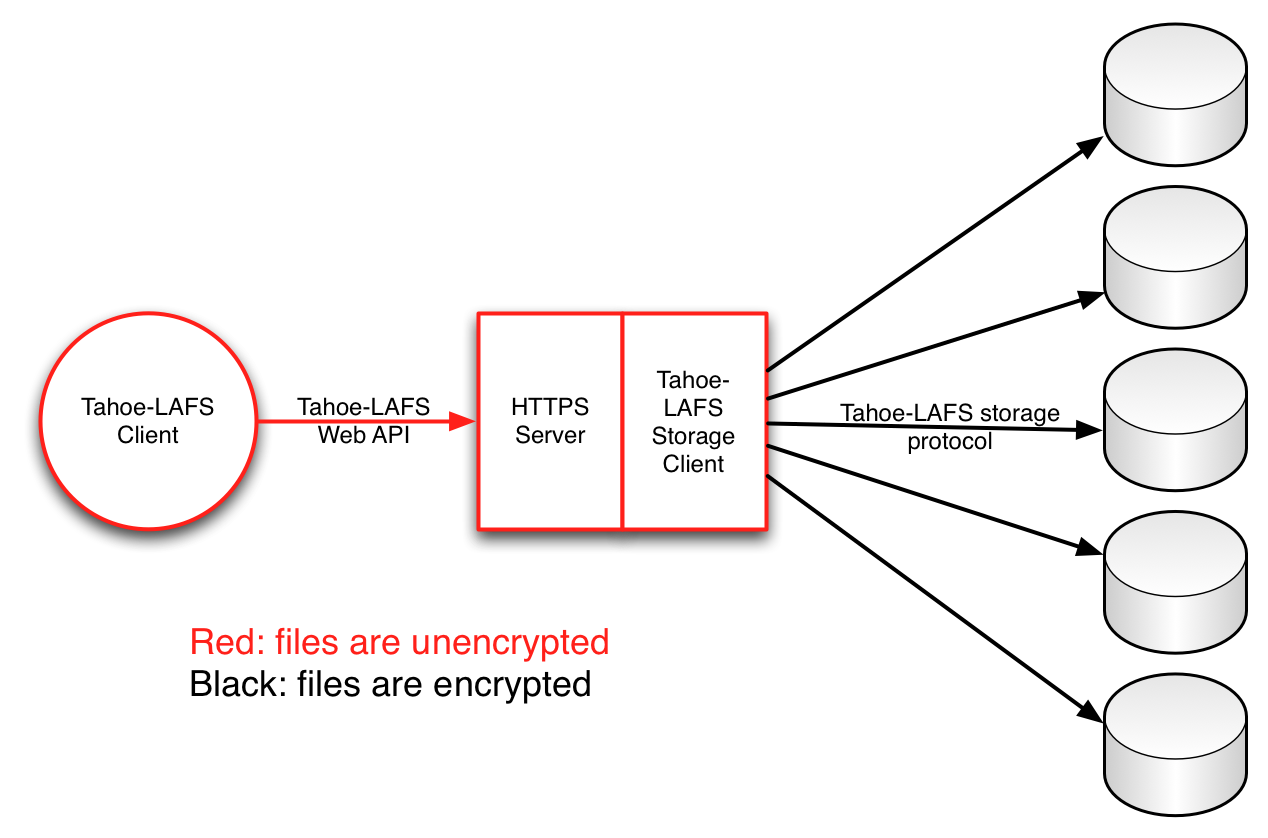
Overview of Tahoe-LAFS

The Tahoe-LAFS Client sends an unencrypted file via a web API to the HTTPS Server. The HTTPS Server passes the file off to the Tahoe-LAFS Storage client which encrypts the file and then uses erasure coding to store fragments of the file on multiple storage drives.

Tahoe-LAFS features "provider-independent security", in that the integrity and confidentiality of the files are guaranteed by the algorithms used on the client, independent of the storage servers, which may fail or may be operated by untrusted entities. Files are encrypted using AES, then split up using erasure coding, such that only a subset K of the original N servers storing the file chunks need to be available in order to recreate the original file. The default parameters are K=3, N=10, so each file is shared across 10 different servers, accessing it requires the correct function of any 3 of those servers.

Tahoe provides very little control over on which nodes data is stored.

== Fork ==
A patched version of Tahoe-LAFS exists from 2011, and was made to run on anonymous networks such as I2P, with support for multiple introducers. There is also a version for Microsoft Windows. In contrast to normal Tahoe-LAFS operation, when I2P and Tahoe-LAFS are used together the location of the nodes are disguised. This allows for anonymous distributed grids to be formed.

== See also ==
- CephFS (file system)
- Coda (file system)
- Comparison of distributed file systems
- Freenet
- GlusterFS
- Moose File System
- LizardFS
- iFolder
- List of distributed file systems
- Lustre (file system)
- Parallel Virtual File System
- XtreemFS
- IPFS
