= Red Hat Gluster Storage =

Computer storage product

- Developers: Red Hat, Inc.
- Stable release: 3.5
- Type: Distributed file system
- Website: https://access.redhat.com/products/red-hat-storage

Red Hat Gluster Storage, formerly Red Hat Storage Server, is a computer storage product from Red Hat. It is based on open source technologies such as GlusterFS and Red Hat Enterprise Linux.

The latest release, RHGS 3.5, combines Red Hat Enterprise Linux (RHEL 8 and also RHEL 7) with the latest GlusterFS community release, oVirt, and XFS File System.

In April 2014, Red Hat re-branded GlusterFS-based Red Hat Storage Server to "Red Hat Gluster Storage".

== Description ==
Red Hat Gluster Storage, a scale-out NAS product, uses as its basis GlusterFS, a distributed file-system. Red Hat Gluster Storage also exemplifies software-defined storage (SDS).

== History ==
In June 2012, Red Hat Gluster Storage was announced as a commercially supported integration of GlusterFS with Red Hat Enterprise Linux. In 2022, it was announced Red Hat Gluster Storage version 3.5 will be the final version and this particular commercial offering will reach end-of-life at the end of 2024.

=== Releases ===
- 3.5
- 3.4
- 3.3 Release Notes
- 3.2
- 3.1
- 3.0
- 2.1
