= EMC Elastic Cloud Storage =

EMC Elastic Cloud Storage (ECS), formerly Project Nile, is an object storage software product marketed by EMC Corporation. It is marketed as software-defined storage that follows several principles of object storage, such as scalability, data resilience, and cost efficiency.

== Applications ==
EMC Elastic Cloud Storage has several applications, including the Internet of things and financial services, where it was determined by Cohasset Associates Inc. to meet "the relevant storage requirements of SEC Rule 17a-4(f) and CFTC Rule 1.31(b)-(c)" when "Compliance is enabled for a Namespace and when properly configured and utilized to store and retain records in non-erasable and non-rewritable format." Its use of object storage and flat namespace, according to the Edison Group, "allows for multiple types of data to be stored side by side. Regardless of the data, it is all viewed as object, their globally unique IDs, and metadata." This approach allows multiple data types from multiple sources to be stored alongside one another, including:

- Large data sets: Financial, pharmaceutical, geospatial, biotech, and legal
- Public data sets: Weather, government
- Security, imagery, and social media: Images, videos, blogs
- Revenue chain data: Sensors, devices, Internet of Things.

ECS was mentioned in a marketing vendor assessment for object storage in 2014.
