= MuLinux =

Operating system

muLinux
- OS family: Linux (Unix-like)
- Working state: Frozen
- Latest release: 14r0 / February 10, 2004; 22 years ago
- Supported platforms: x86-32 and later
- Kernel type: Monolithic kernel
- Default user interface: Unix shell and fvwm95
- License: GPL and other
- Official website: Micheleandreoli (Archived from: )

muLinux was an Italian, English-language lightweight Linux distribution maintained by mathematics and physics professor Michele Andreoli, meant to allow very old and obsolete computers (80386, 80486 and Pentium Pro hardware dating from 1986 through 1998) to be used as basic intranet/Internet servers or text-based workstations with a UNIX-like operating system. It was also designed for quickly turning any 80386 or later computer into a temporary, powerful Linux machine, along with system repair, education, forensic analysis and what the developer called proselytizing. In 2004 reviewer Paul Zimmer wrote, "Although there are several other single-floppy Linux distributions, none can match muLinux's extensive and unique combination of useful features." The last version update was in 2004, when further development of this "linux-on-a-floppy" distribution ended.

== Name ==
The name muLinux comes from the Greek letter mu which is the SI symbol meaning one millionth, harking to the very small size of this OS.

== Minimalist design ==
muLinux was based on the Linux 2.0.36 kernel. Development was frozen in 2004 at version 14r0, with some of the code and packages taken from software releases going back to 1998 (owing only to their smaller sizes). An experimental, unstable version called Lepton had the 2.4 kernel.

muLinux could be both booted and installed to a hard drive on an obsolete machine from floppy disks. A highly functional UNIX-like, network-enabled server with a Unix shell could be had from but one floppy disk. Another floppy disk added workstation functionality and a legacy X Window VGA GUI came with a third floppy. One reviewer noted, "It's not gorgeous, but the whole X subsystem fits onto a single floppy. Egad." muLinux could also be unpacked and installed by a self-executable archive, or extracted directly, onto an old DOS or Windows 9x (umsdos) partition without harming the current OS. If the machine had a floppy disk drive muLinux also would run on an otherwise diskless computer and no CD-ROM drive was needed.

Owing to its minimalist design muLinux was a single-user OS, with all operations performed by the root user. It used the ext2 Linux native file system (rather than the slower Minix file system seen in other single-floppy takes on Linux). The OS was robust when used for text-based tasks along with basic file, light web page or email serving. It could also be adapted as a very tiny, stand-alone embedded system.

muLinux was sometimes installed by Windows users who wanted to learn about the commands and configuration of a Unix-like operating system before taking the step of installing a full Linux distribution or BSD release, although on later computers this could easily be done with any one of many live CD distributions. Since the distribution was always wholly targeted at old hardware and meant to have a tiny footprint, Andreoli warned at the time that muLinux should not be used to evaluate Linux or open source software. The OS came with a lean and pithy online help system which also happened to be an introduction to UNIX, written in an English which the developer called "fractured." The OS had "cheery dialogues" and a friendly sense of humour sprinkled throughout.

== System requirements ==
muLinux needed only minimal hardware, hence it would run on many thoroughly obsolete but still-working computers. Some machines from the later 1980s or very early 1990s may have needed additional SIMMs for enough RAM but overall, the requirements were only slightly higher than those for Windows 3.1 so a still-working machine which when new in 1992 ran Windows 3.1 would likely be able to handle a hard drive installation of muLinux:

- 4 MB RAM if run from a hard drive
- 16 MB RAM if booted from floppies, can boot from floppy with only 8MB
- about 20 MB of hard drive space
- an Intel 80386 or later processor

== Packages ==
muLinux came with many packages, each of which fit on one floppy. muLinux was somewhat unusual in that all of the packages were wholly optional.

- SRV - basic server package with a web server, mail, samba and more
- WKS - basic work station package with mutt, lynx, ssh, pgp and many other Unix shell applications
- X11 - legacy X Window 16 colour VGA environment (see below for SVGA) along with early versions of both fvwm95 and Afterstep window managers (based on the Windows 95 and NeXTSTEP GUI respectively)
- VNC - for virtual network computing
- GCC - C compiler
- TCL - Tcl/Tk+ scripting language, which also brings a few more X applications and tools
- TEX - TeX typesetting system
- PERL - Perl interpreter with modules
- EMU - Wine and Dosemu emulators
- JVM - Kaffe Java virtual machine
- NS1 - SVGA X server along with part of a small but highly obsolete version of Netscape Navigator
- NS2 - second part of Netscape Navigator

Packages by other authors were also made available.
