= Backblaze =

Backup and cloud hosting company

Backblaze, Inc.
- Type: Public
- Traded as: Nasdaq: BLZE
- Industry: Online backup service; Cloud storage
- Founded: April 20, 2007 (19 years ago)
- Founders: Gleb Budman; Billy Ng; Nilay Patel; Brian Wilson; Casey Jones; Tim Nufire; Damon Uyeda
- Headquarters: San Mateo, California, U.S.
- Key people: Gleb Budman (CEO); Marc Suidan (Chief financial officer, 2024-)
- Products: Cloud storage; File backups
- Revenue: ▲US$102 million (2023)
- Operating income: ▼US$−58 million (2023)
- Net income: ▼US$−60 million (2023)
- Total assets: ▼US$132 million (2023)
- Total equity: ▼US$44.9 million (2023)
- Number of employees: 381 (December 2023)
- Website: www.backblaze.com

Backblaze, Inc. is an American cloud storage and data backup company based in San Mateo, California. It was founded in 2007 by Gleb Budman and others. Its services are intended for both business and personal markets.

== History ==
Backblaze was established in 2007 in San Mateo, California. In 2008, the company released online backup services to support PCs running Apple's macOS and Microsoft's Windows.

In October 2021, Backblaze filed to go public on the Nasdaq under the symbol BLZE. In November, the company launched its public IPO.

Backblaze and Catalogic, a data protection vendor, announced their partnership in March 2022.

Since 2013, Backblaze has reported quarterly reliability statistics for its data center hard drives, showing annual failure rates for each model. Backblaze’s public hard-drive dataset has also been used in academic research; a 2026 study in IEEE Transactions on Cloud Computing used the dataset to estimate differences in hard-drive reliability across manufacturers.

On November 28, 2025, Backblaze announced a strategic integration with Shareio, a new platform enabling creators to monetize and protect their digital content.

Backblaze has six data centers; four in the United States, one in Canada and one in Europe.

As of April 2025, Backblaze has been reporting losses every quarter ever since going public in November 2021.

== Products ==
Backblaze's first product was its computer backup, offering users to back up their computer data continuously and automatically with a monthly subscription service.

In September 2015, Backblaze launched a new product, B2 Cloud Storage. Being an infrastructure as a service (IaaS), it is targeted at software integration for different kinds of businesses.

In May 2020, Backblaze released an Amazon S3-compatible API, allowing customers to use existing tools and applications with B2 Cloud Storage without rewriting them. In May 2022, Backblaze released its cloud replication services, which allow customers to back up and store data in a location that is geographically separate from the data's primary location.
