= Cloudian =

Cloud storage company

- Type: Private
- Industry: Enterprise software Object storage
- Founded: 2011
- Headquarters: San Mateo, California, U.S.
- Area served: Worldwide
- Key people: Michael Tso (CEO & co-founder); Jon Toor (CMO); Gary Ogasawara (CTO)
- Products: HyperStore; HyperStore File Services; HyperIQ
- Services: Object storage Hybrid cloud storage
- Website: cloudian.com

Cloudian is an object storage platform company based in San Mateo, California, founded in 2011. It develops software for object and cloud storage.

== History ==
In 2001, Michael Tso formed a company called Gemini Mobile Technologies, together with other MIT alumni, including Joseph Norton. Tso had been an undergraduate student at the Massachusetts Institute of Technology (MIT) in the 1990s where he learned about parallel computing from professors Bill Dally and Greg Papadopoulos. He studied as a graduate student at MIT under David D. Clark. Gemini Mobile Technologies was later relaunched in 2011.

Cloudian was co-founded out of Gemini Mobile Technologies by Michael Tso and Hiroshi Ohta in 2012. The new company had an increased focus on distributed computing and distributed storage.

In 2014 TechCrunch reported that Cloudian had raised $24 million from investors that included Intel and the Innovation Corporate Network of Japan. In March 2018, Cloudian acquired Infinity Storage, an Italian software company. Later that year TechCrunch reported a $94 million investment in Cloudian from companies that included Goldman Sachs. In June 2024 it received an additional $60 million investment.

== Products ==
Cloudian products include HyperStore, a software defined storage alternative to cloud-based services built to run on commodity hardware. It is compatible with Amazon Web Services's S3 service. In February 2024, the company released HyperStore version 8 unifying its object and file data products. In 2024 Cloudian collaborated with Nvidia to provide functionality between HyperStore's object storage and Nvidia's graphics processing units (GPUs).

Cloudian released HyperIQ in 2020, a monitoring system for storage performance and usage. HyperIQ was updated in 2021 to support management of multiple storage clusters. In 2022, HyperBalance was released, providing a load balancer for S3 traffic.

Cloudian holds U.S. patents relating to hybrid cloud, object storage, and hierarchical data management.

In July 2025, Cloudian announced that it had extended its object storage system with a vector database, with the idea of reducing data movement for artificial intelligence workloads (in particular, between storage and GPUs).

== Adoption ==
Organizations with Cloudian deployments include PostFinance, Rabobank, and Vox Media. Its HyperStore system has been used by NEC and Osaka University for high-performance computing applications. In July 2023, the United States National Library of Medicine (operating under the National Institutes of Health) awarded a five-year contract for Cloudian HyperStore systems and subscriptions. Cloudian partnered with VMware in 2024.

Cloudian has partnered with hardware manufacturers and cloud service providers including Amazon Web Services, Lenovo, and Supermicro. According to MIT News, Cloudian was working with about 1,000 companies as of August 2025.

== Reception ==
Cloudian has received both positive and negative evaluations from independent parties. Cloudian was recognized by Gartner with a "Customer's Choice" award in 2022 for distributed file systems and object storage, its third year in a row of receiving the award. However, the company was dropped by Gartner's comparison in October 2024, due to not meeting the inclusion criteria of "a single platform for file and object workloads." Prior to being dropped, Cloudian had been categorized as a "Challenger" in Gartner's "Gartner Magic Quadrant", behind companies such as NetApp, VAST Data, Hitachi Vantara, and Huawei as well as behind "leaders" such as IBM, Dell Technologies, Pure Storage, Scality, and Qumulo.

== See also ==
- Amazon web services
- Cloud computing#Hybrid
- Data storage
- DataCore
- Google Cloud Platform
- Object storage
- Microsoft Azure
- Nutanix
- Weka (software)
