= Compact Disc File System =

CD-ROM file system

The Compact Disc File System (CDFS) is a file system for read-only and write-once CD-ROMs developed by Simson Garfinkel and J. Spencer Love at the MIT Media Lab between 1985 and 1986. The file system provided for the creation, modification, renaming and deletion of files and directories on a write-once media. The file system was developed with a write-once CD-ROM simulator and was used to master one of the first CD-ROMs in 1986. CDFS was never sold, but its source code was published on the Internet and the CD-ROMs were distributed to Media Lab sponsors. The file system is the basis of WOFS (Write-once File System), sold by N/Hance systems in 1989.
