= ZFS (IBM file system project) =

Distributed storage research

zFS was an IBM research project to develop a distributed, decentralized file system. It was a follow-on to the IBM DSF (Data Sharing Facility) project to build a serverless file system.
