= Gfarm file system =

- Developer: NPO Tsukuba OSS Technical Support Center
- Stable release: 2.8.0 / September 3, 2023
- Operating system: Linux, FreeBSD, NetBSD, OS X, Solaris
- Type: Distributed file system
- License: X11
- Website: Gfarm file system

Gfarm file system is an open-source distributed file system, generally used for large-scale cluster computing and wide-area data sharing, and provides features to manage replica location explicitly. The name is derived from the Grid Data Farm architecture it implements.

Grid Datafarm is a petascale data-intensive computing project initiated in Japan. The project is a collaboration among High Energy Accelerator Research Organization (KEK), National Institute of Advanced Industrial Science and Technology (AIST), the University of Tokyo, Tokyo Institute of Technology and University of Tsukuba. The challenge involves construction of a Peta- to Exascale parallel filesystem exploiting local storage of PCs spread over the worldwide Grid.

== See also ==
- Distributed file system
- List of file systems, the distributed parallel fault-tolerant file system section
