= Boot File System =

UnixWare file system

BFS
- Developer: Bell Labs
- Full name: Boot File System
- Introduced: with UNIX System V
- Partition IDs: 0x63 (MBR)

Structures
- Directory contents: single inode table
- File allocation: 16-bit inodes

Limits
- Max filename length: 14 characters

Other
- Supported operating systems: SVR4, UnixWare

The Boot File System (named BFS on Linux, but BFS also refers to the Be File System) was used on UnixWare to store files necessary to its boot process.

It does not support directories, and only allows contiguous allocation for files, to make it simpler to be used by the boot loader.

== Implementations ==
Besides the UnixWare support, Martin Hinner wrote a bfs kernel module for Linux that supports it.

He documented the file system layout as part of the process.

The Linux kernel implementation of BFS was written by Tigran Aivazian and it was a part of the standard kernel sources since Linux version 2.3.25 (was merged on 28 October 1999) until Linux version 7.4 (removal was merged on 19 October 2026).

The original BFS was written at AT&T Bell Laboratories for the UNIX System V, Version 4.0 porting base in 1986. It was written by Ron Schnell, who is also the author of Dunnet (game).

BFS was the first non-S5 (System V) Filesystem written using VFS (Virtual Filesystem) for AT&T UNIX.
