= MinIO =

High Performance Object Storage released under the AGPL open-source license

MinIO Object Storage
- Developers: MinIO, Inc
- Release: release-1434511043 / 17 June 2015; 11 years ago
- Stable release: 2025-06-13T11-33-47Z / 23 June 2025; 16 months ago
- Written in: Go
- Type: Object storage
- License: GNU Affero GPL
- Website: min.io
- Repository: github.com/minio/minio

MinIO was an object storage system released under GNU Affero General Public License v3.0. It is API compatible with the Amazon S3 cloud storage service. It is capable of working with unstructured data such as photos, videos, log files, backups, and container images with the maximum supported object size being 50TB.

== History & development ==
MinIO was developed by MinIO Inc, a Silicon Valley–based technology startup founded in November 2014.

MinIO has published a number of benchmarks to disclose both its own performance and the performance of an object storage in general. These benchmarks include comparisons to an Amazon S3 for Trino, Presto, and Spark, as well as throughput results for the S3Benchmark on HDD and NVMe drives.

MinIO was originally released under Apache License 2.0, but in 2021 it was migrated to AGPLv3.

MinIO released a free "community edition" which is only distributed as a source code release and has a greatly simplified administration interface.

In February 2026 Minio, Inc stopped developing MinIO after it had previously stopped distributing compiled versions and accepting new features for their product. Since then it is not maintained anymore.

== Architecture ==
MinIO's storage stack has three major components: MinIO Server, MinIO Client (a.k.a. mc, which is a command-line client for the object and file management with any Amazon S3 compatible servers), and MinIO Client SDK, which can be used by application developers to interact with any Amazon S3 compatible server.

=== MinIO Server ===
MinIO cloud storage server is designed to be bundled along with an existing application stack, and is optimized for large enterprise deployments. MinIO server can be installed both on physical and virtual machines or launched as Docker containers and deployed on container orchestration platforms like Kubernetes.

=== MinIO Client ===
MinIO Client provides an alternative to the standard UNIX commands (e.g. ls, cat, cp, mirror, diff, etc.) and adds support for Amazon S3 compatible cloud storage services. It works on Linux, Mac, and Windows platforms.

=== MinIO Client SDK ===
MinIO provides client SDK for Go, Java, Python, JavaScript, Haskell, and .NET Framework to access any Amazon S3 compatible object storage server.
