= FAT filesystem and Linux =

Widely used Linux filesystem format

Linux has several filesystem drivers for the File Allocation Table (FAT) filesystem format. These are commonly known by the names used in the mount command to invoke particular drivers in the kernel: msdos, vfat, and umsdos.

== History and support ==
Most of the major Linux distributions, including RedHat, SuSE, and Debian, do not employ umsdos to permit installation of Linux on a FAT disc volume. A few distributions do, however. These include distributions such as Phat Linux, which installs in C:\PHAT on DOS by unpacking a ZIP file and is booted by running a COMMAND.COM script named LINUX.BAT, and ZipSlack.

The UMSDOS project was started in 1992 by Jacques Gelinas and made available to the net in January 1994 as a patch. It was included in the standard distribution starting with kernel 1.1.36. UMSDOS was removed from the Linux 2.6.11 kernel for lack of maintenance. UVFAT, an extension of UMSDOS to use the Windows data structures for long filenames instead of its own, was discontinued before release. They should work in 2.4.x kernels.

Earlier Linux distributions which used UMSDOS are MuLinux, Monkey Linux and Winlinux 2000.

== Feature comparison ==
All of the Linux filesystem drivers support all three FAT types, namely FAT12, FAT16 and FAT32. Where they differ is in the provision of support for long filenames, beyond the 8.3 filename structure of the original FAT filesystem format, and in the provision of Unix file semantics that do not exist as standard in the FAT filesystem format such as file permissions. The filesystem drivers are mutually exclusive. Only one can be used to mount any given disk volume at any given time. Thus the choice among them is determined by what long filenames and Unix semantics they support and what use one wants to make of the disk volume.

=== msdos ===
The msdos filesystem driver provides no extra Unix file semantics and no long filename support. If a FAT disk filesystem is mounted using this driver, only 8.3 filenames will be visible, no long filenames will be accessible, nor will any long filename data structures of any kind on the disk volume be maintained. The vfat filesystem driver provides long filename support using the same disk data structures that Microsoft Windows uses for VFAT long filename support on FAT format volumes, but it does not support any extra Unix file semantics. The umsdos filesystem driver provides long filename support, and extra Unix file semantics. However, it does so using on-disk data structures that are not recognized by any filesystem drivers for any operating systems other than Linux.

=== umsdos ===
The key advantage to umsdos out of the three is that it provides full Unix file semantics. Therefore, it can be used in situations where it is desirable to install Linux on and run it from a FAT disk volume, which require such semantics to be available. However, Linux installed on and running from such a disk volume is slower than Linux installed on and running from a disk volume formatted with, for example, the ext2 filesystem format. Further, unless a utility program is regularly run every time that one switches from running Windows to running Linux, certain changes made to files and directories on the disk by Windows will cause error messages about inaccessible files in Linux.

=== vfat ===
vfat, although lacking full Unix file semantics and lacking the ability to have Linux installed on and running from a FAT disk volume, does not have the aforementioned disadvantages of umsdos when it comes to simply sharing data on a FAT disk volume between Linux and other operating systems such as Windows. Its data structures are the same as those used by Windows for VFAT long filenames, and it does not require running a synchronization utility in order to prevent Windows and Linux data structures from becoming disjointed. For this reason, it is the most appropriate of Linux's FAT filesystem drivers to use in the majority of situations.

FS-Driver	Long filenames	Unix file semantics	Comment
msdos	No	No	8.3 filenames only
vfat	Yes	No	Uses same data structures that Windows uses
umsdos	Yes	Yes	Can host Linux; may need maintenance when switching OS

== Commonalities ==
As mentioned previously, all of the Linux filesystem drivers support all of the three File Allocation Table sizes, 12-bit, 16-bit, and 32-bit. Other common features that they all support are various Linux mounting options (specified with the -o option to the mount command):

uid and gid
These two options tell the filesystem driver to set the (default, in the case of umsdos) owner user ID and group ID to be a single, specified, value for all files in the volume. Both IDs are specified as numeric values (as to be found in the /etc/passwd file). So, for example, to specify to the vfat filesystem driver that all files and directories are to have owner ID 745 and group ID 15, the mount command would be invoked as mount -t vfat -o uid=745,gid=15. Linux filesystem drivers do not at present incorporate support for file/directory passwords on FAT12/FAT16/FAT32 volumes and multi-user world/group/owner access permissions for read/write/delete/execute rights on FAT12/FAT16 volumes as implemented in various operating systems of the Digital Research family, including DR-DOS, PalmDOS, Novell DOS, OpenDOS, FlexOS, Concurrent DOS, Multiuser DOS, System Manager and REAL/32.
umask
This option sets the umask to apply globally to all files in the volume. For example, to specify to the vfat filesystem driver that no "group" or "other" access is to be allowed, the mount command would be invoked as mount -t vfat -o umask=077.
conv
This option specifies file content conversion semantics. It is possible for the filesystem drivers to convert the newline conventions in files, between LF termination and CRLF termination, on the fly as files are read and written. By default this conversion is entirely disabled. The filesystem drivers can perform conversion for some files, attempting to auto-detect what files to convert based upon the extension portion of the filename, or globally for all files. These three conversion levels are specified as conv=b (for "binary"), conv=a (for "auto-detect"), and conv=t (for "text"), respectively. The latter two options carry an inherent risk of corrupting non-text file data. No conversion at all is the default.

== umsdos ==
=== Data structure ===
The umsdos FAT filesystem driver stores all of the extra information relating to Unix file semantics in what, to another FAT filesystem driver, appears to be just a normal file in each directory and subdirectory, named --LINUX-.---.

In the absence of this file in any given directory, and thus by default, the umsdos filesystem driver provides the same semantics as the msdos filesystem driver does for the directory: only 8.3 filenames and no extra Unix file semantics. To enable the umsdos driver's extra abilities, it is necessary to create that file in the directory and synchronize its internal data with the normal FAT data for any existing entries already in the directory. This is done with a tool called umssync.

This is the utility program that is run, across every directory on the disc volume, every time that one switches from running Windows to running Linux, in order for the umsdos filesystem driver to incorporate any changes made to files and directories by Windows into its private data structures in its --LINUX-.--- file. By default, the umssync tool creates --LINUX-.--- files in directories if they do not already exist, resulting in such a file in every directory in the disc volume. When switching between Windows and Linux this behaviour is not often considered desirable. Therefore, the normal mode of operation when invoking umssync after switching from Windows to Linux (which is usually done by running the tool at Linux boot time from a startup script) is to employ the -c option to the command, which prevents the creation of any new --LINUX-.--- files in directories that do not already possess them.

=== Installing Linux on FAT ===
As mentioned, umsdos permits installing Linux on, and then bootstrapping and running it from, a FAT format disc volume. The advantage of this is that it permits the use of Linux on a computer where DOS is already installed, without requiring that the hard disc be repartitioned. Linux is not bootstrapped directly from a Volume Boot Record in such a scenario. Instead DOS is first bootstrapped, and loadlin or linld is used to then bootstrap Linux from DOS.

The convention for such an installation is for the Linux root directory to be a subdirectory of the root directory of the DOS boot volume, e.g. C:\LINUX . The various Linux top-level directories are thus, to DOS, directories such as C:\LINUX\ETC (for /etc), C:\LINUX\BIN (for /bin), C:\LINUX\LIB (for /lib), and so forth. The umsdos filesystem driver automatically prepends the C:\LINUX\ to all pathnames. The location of the Linux root directory is supplied to the umsdos filesystem driver in the first place via an option to the loadlin command. So, for example, loadlin would be invoked with a command line such as loadlin c:\linux\boot\vmlinuz rw root=c:\linux .

The installation of Linux into such a directory in the first place simply involves unpacking files from an archive into that directory and its subdirectories. Such an installation also generally requires the use of a swap file rather than a swap partition for Linux, however this is related to the desire not to repartition the hard disc and unrelated to the umsdos filesystem driver per se.

== Accessing FAT formatted volumes without kernel support ==
Although the filesystem drivers in the kernel make it possible to access files and directories on FAT formatted volumes in the normal manner, it is also possible to do so without kernel driver support, using the utility programs that form the mtools utility suite. Like the vfat FAT filesystem driver, mountlo provides long filename support using the same disc data structures that Microsoft Windows uses.

Alternately, one of the FUSE filesystem drivers may be used—FatFuse, FuseFat or mountlo.

== POSIX overlay filesystem ==
A modern equivalent of UMSDOS is POSIX Overlay Filesystem (posixovl). It works in FUSE.

== See also ==
- DMSDOS (DoubleSpace/DriveSpace/Stacker compatible compressed FAT volumes for Linux)
- Design of the FAT file system
