= NDMP =

NDMP, or Network Data Management Protocol, is a protocol meant to transport data between network attached storage (NAS) devices and backup devices. This removes the need for transporting the data through the backup server itself, thus enhancing speed and removing load from the backup server. It was originally invented by NetApp and Intelliguard, acquired by Legato and then EMC Corporation. Currently, the Storage Networking Industry Association (SNIA) oversees the development of the protocol.

Most contemporary multi-platform backup software support this protocol.
