= Qumulo =

American data storage company

- Type: Privately held company
- Industry: Data storage
- Founded: March 2012; 14 years ago
- Founders: Peter Godman; Aaron Passey; Neal Fachan
- Headquarters: Seattle, Washington, U.S.
- Key people: Douglas Gourlay (President and CEO) Matt Frey (CFO) Michelle Palleschi (COO) Kiran Bhagdeshpur (CTO)
- Products: Distributed file systems
- Website: qumulo.com

Qumulo is an American data storage company based in Seattle, Washington. Founded in 2012, it offers products and services to help other companies manage and curate large amounts of data.

Qumulo’s slogan self describes the company as “The world's most advanced file system – any data, any location, total control.”

As of May 2025, Qumulo maintains a team of 250+ employees across five continents and services clients across all major global markets.

== History ==
Qumulo was founded in March 2012 by Neal Fachan, Peter Godman, and Aaron Passey. They all previously worked at Isilon, a storage platform that was acquired by EMC. Several of Qumulo's key employees are also former Isilon employees.

The company received $2.3-million seed funding from investment company Valhalla Partners. In November 2012, it secured an additional $24.5 million from a Series A round led by Highland Capital Partners. By the end of its first year, the company had raised a total of $26.8 million while releasing few details about its possible product offering.

After an 18-month development period in 2013–2014, Qumulo began selling its products in August 2014. Six months after its product release, the company announced completion of a $40-million funding series led by Kleiner Perkins Caufield & Byers. Before entering the development period, Qumulo employed 18 people which increased to 90 by February 2015 and to 150 employees in January 2016.

The company remained secretive about its product offering until March 2015, when it finally offered specific details of its software, describing it as a "data aware" storage system. This was followed by a $32.5-million funding series in June 2016 adding new investor Allen & Company. However, the company's share price had dropped by more than 35% when compared to previous rounds and the funds generated were below the company's expectations.

In November 2016, Qumulo hired Bill Richter to succeed Godman as CEO. Godman continued as CTO until the end of 2018. Qumulo raised $30 million additional funds in April 2017 and $93 million in June 2018, bringing it total funding to $230 million. In January 2019, the company opened offices in Vancouver, Canada.

In May of 2022, Kiran Bhageshpur stepped in as Qumulo CTO to expand its product development focus to meet growing demand for cloud and AI.

Citing economic conditions and getting the company to profitability, on June 29, 2022 Qumulo laid off 80 employees, approximately 19% of its workforce. Aaron Passey, who helped launch Qumulo back in 2012, returned to the Seattle-based data management company in 2022.

In July 2024 Qumulo hired Douglas Gourlay from Arista Networks and Cisco Systems to replace Bill Richter as President and CEO. Gourlay previously served as Vice President and General Manager of Software at Arista Networks. Prior to Arista, he held executive leadership positions at Cisco Systems. Gourlay has filed or holds over seventy patents in systems and networking technologies.

In August 2024, Michelle Palleschi joined the Qumulo executive team as Executive Vice President and COO. Palleschi previously held leadership positions at Sendoso, Skyport Systems, Apple, and Cisco Systems.

== Products ==
Qumulo develops storage software for file-based data. The file system software can be deployed with on-premise data centers on Qumulo's network-attached storage hardware, as well as on Hewlett Packard Enterprise Apollo and Dell PowerEdge R740xd platforms. It can also be used on the cloud storage platforms Amazon Web Services, Microsoft Azure, or Google Cloud Platform.

In September 2018, the firm announced an update to its software adding machine learning-powered pre-fetch to anticipate which files the user will most likely access next. The software preemptively caches files identified by analyzing user behavior and patterns in file access.

== Funding ==
Qumulo has raised $346 million in funding.

Following its Series E funding round of $125 million in July of 2020, Qumulo achieved “unicorn” status at a valuation of more than $1.2billion.

Series	Date	Amount	Lead Investor(s)
Seed	April 2012	0.5	Valhalla Partners
A	November 2012	24.5	Highland Capital Partners, Madrona Venture Group, Valhalla Partners
B	February 2015	40	Valhalla Partners, Madrona Venture Group, Highland Capital Partners, Kleiner Perkins
C	May 2016	32.5	Allen & Company, Top Tier Capital Partners, Tyche Partners, Valhalla Partners, Madrona Venture Group, Highland Capital Partners, Kleiner Perkins
C1	April 2017	30	Northern Light Venture Capital, Madrona Venture Group, Top Tier Capital Partners, Kleiner Perkins, Tyche Partners
D	June 2018	93	BlackRock, Goldman Sachs, Highland Capital Partners, Madrona Venture Group, Valhalla Partners, Western Digital Cptl, Kleiner Perkins
E	July 2020	125	BlackRock, Highland Capital Partners, Madrona Venture Group, Kleiner Perkins, Amity Ventures
