= High Throughput File System =

High Throughput File System (HTFS) is a journaling file system that was used by SCO OpenServer. The filesystem format is like that of an older SCO filesystem, the Extended Acer Filesystem (EAFS), but designed to be somewhat more future-proof.
