= Scality =

American computer storage company

- Type: Private
- Industry: Information technology, data storage
- Founded: 2009
- Founders: Jérôme Lecat, Giorgio Regni, Daniel Binsfeld, Serge Dugas, Brad King
- Headquarters: San Francisco, California and Paris, France
- Key people: Jérôme Lecat, CEO; Giorgio Regni, CTO; Emilio Roman, CRO; Paul Speciale, CMO; Erwan Girard, Chief Product Officer; Vincent Breuil, Chief Financial Officer
- Products: Software-defined storage (SDS) solutions RING and ARTESCA
- Website: www.scality.com

Scality is a global technology provider of software-defined storage (SDS) solutions, specializing in distributed file and object storage with cloud data management. Scality maintains offices in Paris (France), London (UK), San Francisco and Washington DC (USA), and Tokyo (Japan) and has employees in 14 countries.

== History ==
Scality was founded in 2009 by Jérôme Lecat, Giorgio Regni, Daniel Binsfeld, Serge Dugas, and Brad King.

Scality raised $7 million of venture capital funding in March 2011. A C-round of $22 million was announced in June 2013, led by Menlo Ventures and Iris Capital with participation from FSN PME and all existing investors, including Idinvest Partners, OMNES Capital and Galileo Partners. Scality raised $45 million in August 2015. This Series D funding was led by Menlo Ventures with participation from all existing investors and one new strategic investor, BroadBand Tower. In 2016, HPE made a strategic investment in the company. In April, 2018, the company announced a $60 million round of funding.

Scality announced a distribution agreement with Hewlett-Packard in October 2014. Scality added Dell and Cisco Systems as resellers in 2015.

== Products ==
=== RING ===
Scality's released the first version of its principal product, RING, in 2010. The object and file storage software platform is a multitiered architecture and can scale up to thousands of servers and to exabytes under a single namespace accessible via object (Amazon S3 API) and file system (NFS, SMB) protocols. RING uses a keyspace calculated at install, that is logically spread across all of its node servers. A supervisor service provides systems management and monitoring of system health, internal tasks and metrics. The supervisor process is typically deployed on the RING node servers, but the company states it can also run separately on dedicated servers.

The RING employs erasure coding schemes with variable number of data and parity stripes, and distributes those across the nodes comprising the RING. The underlying file system formatted on the storage drives is used by RING to store object data in container files. RING provides an installer that deploys the packages from a central repository.

Object storage was covered by trade press in 2017.

=== Zenko ===
In 2017, Scality released Zenko, an open source multi-cloud data controller. In 2018, Scality released a commercially supported version of Zenko. Zenko integrates data managed on-premises with services available in public clouds.

Zenko CloudServer (formerly Scality S3 Server) is an Amazon Web Services Simple Storage Service-compatible open source object storage server. The code is written in Node.js. It is a single instance running in a Docker container, and it uses Docker volumes for persistent storage. CloudServer uses the same code as the Scality RING S3 interface and includes an Apache 2.0 license. It is not a distributed system (that is the paid version, S3 for Enterprise). However, it does have the same level of compatibility as the S3 interface for the Scality RING. Zenko Orbit is a cloud-based portal for data placement, workflows, and global metadata search. The product enables asynchronous replication between clouds.

=== ARTESCA ===
Launched in April 2021, ARTESCA is an S3 object storage software solution for modern applications. ARTESCA was built for business application owners, DevOps and edge builders. It has a UI to simplify data management and offers a single pane of glass for admins, but its functions are also accessible via RESTful API.

ARTESCA delivers high-performance S3 object storage with advanced features for cyber-resilience and data protection. ARTESCA 2.0, released in May 2023, expanded features to protect against ransomware, including object locking, sharding and backup to object capabilities. Offered in an appliance configuration, ARTESCA integrates with Veeam Backup and Replication for a plug-and-play experience that simplifies deployment.

== Versions ==
- Scality released version 4.2 in October 2013 which added native file access protocols including Network File System (NFS), Server Message Block (SMB), Apple Filing Protocol (AFP), and FTP.
- Scality released version 4.3 of the RING software in July 2014, improving performance, adding replication options, and introducing a redesigned management GUI.
- In November 2014, Scality made generally available a plug-in for OpenStack Swift, enabling Swift-compatible applications to use the Scality RING as a storage backend without modification. Scality also released an open-source driver that enables the creation of block storage volumes that can connect to CDMI-compatible storage backends.
- Scality released version 5.0 of the RING software in March 2015, simplifying installation and configuration, expanding Windows support, and improving video streaming and content distribution performance
- Version 6.0 of the Scality RING was introduced in 2016
- Scality open sourced their object server frontend called S3 Server that implements the AWS S3 API in July 2017, the source code is available on Github under an Apache 2.0 license and prebuilt containers are available on Docker Hub
- Scality RING 7.0 launched in June, 2017 with enhanced security and multi-cloud file and object storage.
- Scality RING 8.0 launched in December 2019 with improvements to Distributed Lock Manager, a new NFS connector with support for NFSv4, non-root execution, KMIP for KMS, S3 Quotas and Administration UI improvements.
- Scality RING 8.5 released in September 2021 became the new Long Term Support (LTS) version.
- Scality RING 9.0 was released in April 2022, featuring a host of improvements.
- Scality RING 9.5 was released in July 2025 and became an LTS version, supporting RHEL/Rocky Linux 8 and 9.
