= VDURA =

American data storage company

VDURA (formerly Panasas) is an American AI and HPC data infrastructure software company, specialized in high-performance solutions for AI and HPC workloads. The rebranding in 2024 marked its shift from hardware to a software-defined storage provider.

Headquartered in San Jose, California, with offices in Pittsburgh, Pennsylvania and Boulder, Colorado VDURA is led by its current CEO Ken Claffey.

== History ==
Panas was founded in 1999 by Garth Gibson, one of the developers of RAID and the co-author of pNFS. They initially developed parallel file systems, creating PanFS, a parallel network-attached storage (NAS) system that supports high-performance computing (HPC) and AI applications. Panasas gained early recognition for its innovative technology, which played a crucial role in HPC environments. The first Panasas products were developed in 2004.

On May 7, 2024 Panasas became VDURA.

== Product portfolio ==
VDURA facilitates scaling, metadata processing and training cycles for AI and HPC. They provide scalable solutions to life science enterprises and research institutes that speed up discoveries while preserving data efficiency and integrity, and supply technological solutions to federal agencies, guaranteeing the protection and accessibility of critical data.

== World record data lift ==
On November 20, 2024, VDURA collaborated with Hafþór Júlíus Björnsson who lifted 282.6 Petabytes (3.18×10^{17} bytes) of data in Phison SSD drives to break the world record for the most data lifted by a human being.
