= KFS =

KFS may refer to:

== Businesses ==
- Kalitta Charters, ICAO code
- Kenya Ferry Services, operator of the Likoni Ferry service
- Koç Financial Services, owner of the Turkish bank Koçbank

== Medicine ==
- Klippel–Feil syndrome, a rare congenital condition
- Swiss Cancer Research (German: Krebsforschung Schweiz), a non-profit

== Other uses ==
- CloudStore (formerly Kosmosfs), a C++ implementation of Google File System
- Kristeligt Forbund for Studerende, a Danish Christian student movement
