= RozoFS =

- Developers: Rozo Systems, SAS.
- Stable release: 2.5.1 / 26 February 2018
- Written in: C and Python
- Operating system: Linux, Mac OS X, NetBSD, FreeBSD, OpenSolaris
- Type: Distributed file system
- License: GNU General Public License v2
- Website: www.rozosystems.com

RozoFS is a free software distributed file system. It comes as a free software, licensed under the GNU GPL v2. RozoFS uses erasure coding for redundancy.

== Design ==
Rozo provides an open source POSIX filesystem, built on top of distributed file system architecture similar to Google File System, Lustre or Ceph. The Rozo specificity lies in the way data is stored. The data to be stored is translated into several chunks using Mojette Transform and distributed across storage devices in such a way that it can be retrieved even if several pieces are unavailable. On the other hand, chunks are meaningless alone. Redundancy schemes based on coding techniques like the one used by RozoFS allow to achieve significant storage savings as compared to simple replication.

The file system comprises three components:

- Exports server – (Meta Data Server) manages the location (layout) of chunks (managing capacity load balancing with respect to high availability), file access and namespace (hierarchy). Multiple replicated metadata servers are used to provide failover. The Exports server is a user-space daemon; the metadata are stored synchronously to a usual file system (the underlying file system must support extended attributes).
- Storage servers – (Chunk Server) store the chunks. The Chunk server is also a user-space daemon that relies on the underlying local file system to manage the actual storage.
- Clients – talk to both the exports server and chunk servers and are responsible for data transformation. Clients mount the file system into user-space via FUSE.

== See also ==
- MapR FS
- Mojette Transform
- Distributed file system
- List of file systems, the distributed parallel fault-tolerant file system section
- GlusterFS
- BeeGFS
- MooseFS

== Press articles ==
- Storage Insider "Innovative Ansätze hauchen Scale-out NAS neues Leben ein" article July 2016
- Storage Insider "Storage-Startups: Die nächste Welle rollt" article July 2016
- CDP Blog "A new iteration to make Erasure Coding universal" article May 2016
- Storage Newsletter "MemoScale With New Iteration to Make Erasure Coding Universal" article May 2016
- "Could Rozo squeeze into the scale-out NAS-object scalability gap?". The Register. December 2015.
- Le Monde Informatique "Rozo passe à l'erasure coding 128 bits pour la v2 de son NAS distribué" article Dec. 2015
- Le Mag IT (TechTarget) "Rozo Systems dévoile la version 2.0 de sa technologie NAS distribuée" article Dec. 2015
- Storage Newsletter "V2.0 of RozoFS Scale-Out NAS Software" article Dec. 2015
- Silicon.fr "OpenIO, Outpace.io et Rozo: le stockage made in France s’exporte aux US" article Dec. 2015
- "Big Blue boosts Spectrum Scale, polishes the parallel file systems". The Register. December 1, 2015.
- ChannelNews "OpenIO et Rozo Systems, les deux pépites françaises du SDS" article Nov. 2015
- "French upstart Rozo: Magic beans will help us become storage giant". The Register. October 2015.
- Storage Newsletter "Start-Up Profile: Rozo Systems in Software-Defined Scale-Out NAS" article Oct. 2015
- Le Monde Informatique "La start-up française Rozo Systems recrute dans la Silicon Valley" article Oct. 2015
