= Mojette transform =

The Mojette transform is an application of discrete geometry. More specifically, it is a discrete and exact version of the Radon transform, thus a projection operator.

The IRCCyN laboratory - UMR CNRS 6597 in Nantes, France has been developing it since 1994.

The first characteristic of the Mojette transform is using only additions and subtractions. The second characteristic is that the Mojette Transform is redundant, spreading the initial geometrical information into several projections.

This transform uses discrete geometry in order to dispatch information onto a discrete geometrical support. This support is then projected by the Mojette operator along discrete directions. When enough projections are available, the initial information can be reconstructed.

The Mojette transform has been already used in numerous applications domains:

- Medical tomography
- Network packet transfer
- Distributed storage on disks or networks
- Image fingerprinting and image cryptography schemes

== History ==
After one year of research, the first communication introducing the Mojette Transform was held in May 1995 in the first edition of CORESA National Congress CCITT Rennes. Many others will follow it for 18 years of existence. In 2011, the book The Mojette Transform: Theory and Applications at ISTE-Wiley was well received by the scientific community. All this support has encouraged the IRCCyN research team to continue the research on this topic.

Jeanpierre Guédon, professor and inventor of the transform called it: "Mojette Transform". The word "Mojette" comes from the name of white beans in Vendee, originally written "Moghette" or "Mojhette". In many countries, bean is a basic educational tool representing an exact unit that teaches visually additions and subtractions. Therefore, the choice of the name "Mojette" serves to emphasize the fact that the transform uses only exact unit in additions and subtractions.

The original purpose of the Mojette Transform was to create a discrete tool to divide the Fourier plane into angular and radial sectors. The first attempt of application was the psychovisual encoding of image, reproducing the human vision channel. However, it was never realized.

== Mathematics ==
The "raw" transform Mojette definition is this:

$proj(b,p,q)=\sum_{k}^{}\sum_{l}^{}f(k,l)\Delta(b+kq-pl)$

$\Delta(b) = 1$	$if \,\ b = 0$
$\Delta(b) = 0$	$otherwise$

The following figure 1 helps to explain the “raw” transform Mojette.

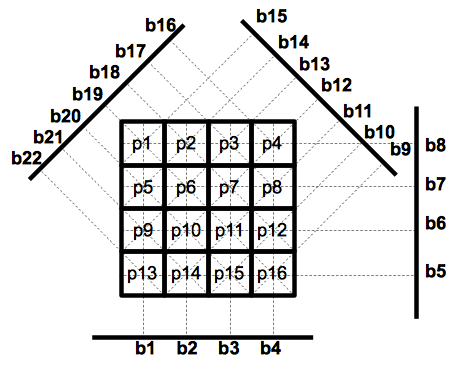
Figure 1 : 4x4 grid with 16 pixels, 4 projections and 22 bins

We start with the function f represented by 16 pixels from p1 to p16. The possible values of the function at the point (k, l) are different according to the applications. This can be a binary value of 0 or 1 that it often used to differentiate the object and the background. This can be a ternary value as in the Mojette game. This can be also a finite set of integers value from 0 to (n-1), or more often we take a set of cardinality equal to a power of 2 or a prime number. But it can be integers and real numbers with an infinite number of possibilities, even though this idea has never been used.

With the index "k" as "kolumn" and “l” as a “line”, we define a Cartesian coordinate system. But here we will only need the integer coordinates. On Figure 2, we have arbitrarily chosen the left bottom point as the origin (0,0) and the direction of the two axes. The coordinates of each pixel are denoted in red on Figure 2.

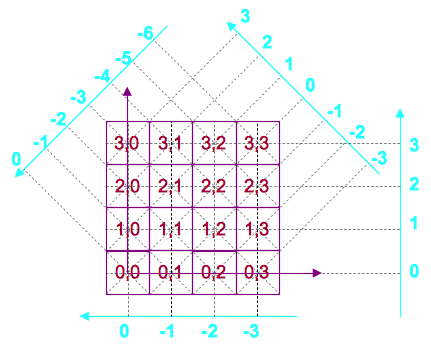
Figure 2 : Mark of 4x4 grid and projections

For the projections, the coordinate system is derived from that of the grid. Indeed, it meets two requirements: 1) The pixel (0,0) is always projected on the point 0 of the projection (this is a consequence of linearity of the Mojette operator) 2) The direction of the projection is fixed "counterclockwise" as in trigonometry when going from 0 ° to 180 °.

Altogether, it necessarily gives the positions of the bins like the ones in blue color on the Figure 2. Let’s head back to the formula (1): the red dots correspond to the index (k, l) and the blue dots to the index b. The only elements remaining to clarify are the (p, q) values.

These two values (p, q) are precisely those characterizing the Mojette Transform. They define the projection angle. Figure 3 shows colored arrows corresponding with the color code to the projection indexed by (p, q). For the 90° angle, the projection is shown below the grid for convenience but the direction is upward. Table 1 shows the correspondence between the angles in degrees and the values of p and q.

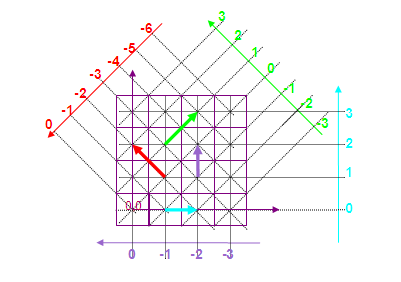
Figure 3: Projections of direction (p, q) of the 4x4 grid

0°	p=1	q=0	b-l=0
45°	p=1	q=1	b+k-l=0
90°	p=0	q=1	b+k=0
135°	p=-1	q=1	b+k+l=0

Table 1 : The correspondence of the angles projections with direction equation b + qk - pl = 0

The only valid Mojette angles are given by the following rules:

1. An angle is given by the direction of projection in line and column
2. A direction is composed of two integers (p, q) with gcd (p, q) = 1
3. An angle is always between 0 and 180 °, which means that q is never negative

These rules ensure the uniqueness in the correspondence of an angle and (p, q) values. For example, the 45 ° angle, the Rule 2 forbid to define the angle pairs (2,2) or (3,3) and Rule 3 prohibits to use (-2, -2) and (-1, -1). Only the angle (p = 1, q = 1) satisfies the three rules.

== Applications and achievements ==
=== The distributed storage disk or network ===
The most important area of application using the "Mojette Transform" is distributed storage. Particularly, this method is used in RozoFS, an open-source distributed file system. In this application, the "Mojette Transform" is used as an erasure code in order to provide reliability, while significantly reducing the total amount of stored data when compared to classical techniques like replication (typically by a factor of 2). Thus, it significantly reduces the cost of the storage cluster in terms of hardware, maintenance or energy consumption for example.

In 2010, Pierre Evenou, research engineer of the IVC team IRCCyN laboratory, decided to create the start-up Fizians (currently known as Rozo Systems) using this application. The start-up offers storage solutions in cloud computing, virtualization, storage servers, file servers, backup and archiving.

=== Networks packets transfer ===
Thanks to the redundancy of the transform, sent packets can be fragmented without loss. Additionally, the fact of using only additions and subtractions increases the speed of information transmission. Finally, the information cannot be reconstructed without having the initial angle of the projections, so it also provides data security.

This application has been selected by Thales Cholet for its ad hoc network (using wireless network and terminals to transmit messages between them) in order to secure the information and has multiple paths between the source and destination. In 2002, the start-up PIBI has used this technology to provide secure Internet payment services.

=== The Medical tomography ===
In the field of medical imaging, the properties of the “Transform Mojette” create a direct mapping and solve the missing wedge problem. However, the image acquisition using the Mojette transform has not been yet developed. The problem of obtaining exact “Mojette” values while using approximated data acquisition has been studied but has to be continued. Besides, the post-processing of medical images is doing well since data acquisition is already done.

These results are used by the company Keosys in 2001 with Jerome Fortineau and the company Qualiformed created in 2006 by Stephen Beaumont. Prof. Guédon and the IRCCyN laboratory were heavily involved in the creation of these two companies. The companies have already financed several PhD students and participated in research projects in order to continue the development of the application in medical tomography. The results have led to apply patents and implementation on their equipment of image processing.

=== The watermarking and image encryption ===
Cryptography and watermarking were also part of the research conducted in the IRCCyN laboratory. It provides solutions for security and authentication.

In cryptography, the instability of the transformed Mojette secures data. The fact that the transform is exact encrypts information and allows no deviation even minimal. For watermarking, the transform is very effective in fingerprinting. By inserting "Mojette Transform" marks in images, one can authenticate documents using the same properties as in cryptography.

== Bibliography ==
- Jeanpierre Guédon, N. Normand, B. Parrein, and C. Pouliquen, “Distributed image transmission and storage on Internet system,” in ACIDCA, 2000, pp. 164–169.
- B. Parrein, N. Normand, and J. Guédon, “Multiple description coding using exact discrete Radon transform,” in IEEE Data Compression Conference, 2001, p. 508.
- J. Guédon, N. Normand, P. Verbert, B. Parrein, F. Autrusseau, “Load-balancing and scalable multimedia distribution using the Mojette transform,” in Internet Multimedia Management Systems II, ITCOM, 2001, pp. 226–234.
- J. Guédon, B. Parrein, N. Normand, “Internet Distributed Image Information System,” Integrated Computer-Aided Engineering, vol. 8, no. 3, pp. 205–214, Sep. 2008.
- B. Parrein, “Description multiple de l’information par transformation Mojette,” Université de Nantes, 2008.
- F. Autrusseau and J. Guédon, “Image watermarking for copyright protection and data hiding via the Mojette transform,” in Security and Watermarking of Multimedia Contents IV, 2002, pp. 378–386.
- F. Autrusseau and J. Guédon, “Image Watermarking in the Fourier Domain Using the Mojette Transform,” in Digital Signal Processing, 2002, pp. 725–728.
- F. Autrusseau, “Modélisation Psychovisuelle pour le tatouage des images,” Université de Nantes, 2011.
- F. Autrusseau and J. Guédon, “A joint multiple description-encryption image algorithm,” in International Conference on Image Processing, 2003, pp. 269–272.
- J. Guédon, N. Normand, and B. Parrein, “Multimedia packet transport: multiple layers or descriptions?,” in IEEE Packet Video workshop, 2003, p. 7 p.
- B. Parrein, N. Normand, and J. Guédon, “Multimedia forward error correcting codes for wireless LAN,” Annales des Télécommunications, vol. 58, no. 3–4, pp. 448–463, Jul. 2008.
- F. Autrusseau and J. Guédon, “Chiffrement Mojette d’images médicales,” Ingénierie des Systèmes d’Information (ISI), vol. 8, no. 1, pp. 113–134, Feb. 2008.
- O. Déforges, M. Babel, N. Normand, B. Parrein, J. Ronsin, J. Guédon, and L. Bédat, “Le LAR aux Mojettes,” in CORESA 04 - COmpression et REprésentation des Signaux Audiovisuels, 2004, pp. 165–168.
- P. Verbert, V. Ricordel, J. Guédon, and P. Verbert, “Analysis of mojette transform projections for an efficient coding,” in Workshop on Image Analysis for Multimedia Interactive Services (WIAMIS, 2004, p. -.
- M. Babel, B. Parrein, O. Déforges, N. Normand, J. Guédon, and J. Ronsin, “Secured and progressive transmission of compressed images on the Internet: application to telemedicine,” in SPIE 17th Annual Symposium / Electronic Imaging - Internet Imaging, 2005, pp. 126–136.
- J. Guédon and N. Normand, “The Mojette Transform: The First Ten Years,” in Discrete Geometry for Computer Imagery, 2005, vol. 3429, pp. 79–91.
- M. Servières, N. Normand, J. Guédon, and Y. Bizais, “The Mojette Transform: Discrete Angles for Tomography,” in Discrete Tomography and its Applications, 2005, vol. 20, pp. 587–606.
- M. Servieres, “Reconstruction Tomographique Mojette,” Université de Nantes; Ecole centrale de nantes - ECN, 2009.
- F. Autrusseau, P. Evenou, and T. Hamon, “Secure Distributed Storage based on the Mojette transform,” in Nouvelles technologies de la répartition, 2006, pp. 161–170.
- F. Autrusseau, B. Parrein, and M. Servieres, “Lossless Compression Based on a Discrete and Exact Radon Transform: A Preliminary Study,” in International Conference on Acoustics, Speech and Signal Processing, 2006, pp. 425–428.
- M. Kalantari, F. Jung, G. Moreau, and J. Guédon, “Détection entièrement automatique de points de fuite dans des scènes architecturales urbaines,” in CORESA 2006 COmpression et REprésentation des Signaux Audiovisuels, 2006, pp. 41–46.
- E. Denis, J. Guédon, S. Beaumont, and N. Normand, “Discrete and continuous description of a three dimensional scene for quality control of radiotherapy treatment planning systems,” in Medical Imaging, 2006, vol. 6142, p. 187.
- M. Servières, N. Normand, and J. Guédon, “Interpolation method for the Mojette Transform,” in Medical Imaging 2006: Physics of Medical Imaging, 2006, vol. 6142, p. 61424I.
- N. Normand, A. Kingston, and P. Évenou, “A Geometry Driven Reconstruction Algorithm for the Mojette Transform,” in Discrete Geometry for Computer Imagery, 2006, vol. 4245, pp. 122–133.
- S. Hamma, E. Cizeron, H. Issaka, and J. Guédon, “Performance evaluation of reactive and proactive routing protocol in IEEE 802.11 ad hoc network,” in ITCom 06 - next generation and sensor networks, 2008, p. 638709.
- M. Kalantari and M. Kasser, “Implementation of a low-cost photogrammetric methodology for 3d modelling of ceramic fragments,” in XXI International CIPA Symposium, 01-6 October, Athens, Greece, 2007, p. FP079.
- A. Kingston, S. Colosimo, P. Campisi, and F. Autrusseau, “Lossless Image Compression and Selective Encryption Using a Discrete Radon Transform,” in International Conference on Image Processing, 2007, pp. 465–468.
- E. Denis, S. Beaumont, J. Guédon, N. Normand, and T. Torfeh, “Automatic quality control of digitally reconstructed radiograph computation and comparison with standard methods,” in Medical Imaging 2007: Physics of Medical Imaging, 2007, vol. 6510, p. 65104J.
- A. Daurat and N. Normand, “Transformation et reconstruction par projections,” in Géométrie discrète et images numériques, A. M. David Coeurjolly, Ed. Hermès, 2008, pp. 239–251.
- N. Normand and J. Guédon, “Applications de la transformation Mojette,” in Géométrie discrète et images numériques, A. M. David Coeurjolly, Ed. Hermès, 2008, pp. 337–347.
- B. Parrein, F. Boulos, P. Le Callet, and J. Guédon, “Priority image and video encoding transmission based on a discrete Radon transform,” in IEEE Packet Video 2007, 2007, p. 6 pages.
- S. Chandra, I. Svalbe, and J. Guédon, “An exact, non-iterative Mojette inversion technique utilising ghosts,” in 14th IAPR international conference on Discrete geometry for computer imagery, 2008, p. .
- H. Fayad, J. Guédon, I. Svalbe, N. Normand, and Y. Bizais, “Mojette and FRT tomographs,” in Medical Imaging 2008, 2008, vol. 6913, p. -.
- M. Kalantari, F. Jung, J. Guédon, and N. Paparoditis, “Détection automatique des points de fuite et calcul de leur incertitude à l’aide de la géométrie projective,” in RFIA 2008, 2008, pp. 703–712.
- M. Kalantari, F. Jung, N. Paparoditis, and J. Guédon, “Robust and automatic vanishing points detection with their uncertainties from a single uncalibrated image, by planes extraction on the unit SPHERE,” in ISPRS2008, 2008, pp. 203–208.
- H. Fayad, J. Guédon, I. Svalbe, Y. Bizais, and N. Normand, “Applying Mojette discrete Radon transforms to classical tomographic data,” in Medical Imaging, 2008, vol. 6913, p. 69132S.
- A. Kingston and F. Autrusseau, “Lossless Image Compression via Predictive Coding of Discrete Radon Projections,” Signal Processing Image Communication, vol. 23, no. 4, pp. 313–324, Jun. 2008.
- E. Denis, S. Beaumont, J. Guédon, T. Torfeh, N. Normand, and A. Norbert, “New automatic quality control methods for geometrical treatment planning system tools in external conformal radiotherapy,” in Medical Imaging 2008: Physics of Medical Imaging, 2008, vol. 6913, p. 69133F.
- M. Babel, B. Parrein, O. Déforges, N. Normand, J. Guédon, and V. Coat, “Joint source-channel coding: secured and progressive transmission of compressed medical images on the Internet,” Computerized Medical Imaging and Graphics, vol. 32, no. 4, pp. 258–269, Apr. 2008.
- E. Denis, S. Beaumont, J. Guédon, T. Torfeh, N. Normand, and N. Ailleres, “Nouvelle méthode automatique de contrôle de qualité des systèmes de planification géométrique des traitements en radiothérapie externe conformationnelle,” in Journées scientifiques de la Société Française de Physique Médicale, 2008, p. denis.
- A. Kingston, B. Parrein, and F. Autrusseau, “Redundant Image Representation via Multi-Scale Digital Radon Projection,” in International Conf. of Image Processing, 2008, p. 2069.
- P. Jia, J. Dong, L. Qi, and F. Autrusseau, “Directionality Measurement and Illumination Estimation of 3D Surface Textures by Using Mojette Transform,” in 19th International Conference on Pattern Recognition, 2010, p. 1144.
- Y. Ben Hdech, J. Guédon, and S. Beaumont, “Simulations Monte Carlo d’un faisceau de RX issus d’un accélérateur VARIAN : influence du paramétrage des électrons initiaux,” in Journées Scientifiques de la Société Française de Physique Médicale (SFPM) 2009 : Innovations et bénéfices thérapeutiques : quelles limites?, 2009, p. 1.
- Y. Ben Hdech, J. Guédon, and S. Beaumont, “Des Objets-Tests Numériques (OTN) anatomiques pour le Contrôle Qualité (CQ) de Systèmes de Planification de Traitement (TPS) en radiothérapie,” in Journées Scientifiques de la Société Française de Physique Médicale (SFPM) 2009 : Innovations et bénéfices thérapeutiques : quelles limites?, 2009, p. 1.
- M. Kalantari, F. Jung, J. Guédon, and N. Paparoditis, “The Five Points Pose Problem : A New and Accurate Solution Adapted to any Geometric Configuration,” in The Pacific-Rim Symposium on Image and Video Technology (PSIVT), 2009, vol. 5414, p. .
- D. Coeurjolly and N. Normand, “Discrete geometry and projections (chap 1),” in The Mojette Transform: Theory and Applications, jeanpierre Guédon, Ed. iste & wiley, 2009, p. 15 pages.
- J. Guédon and N. Normand, “Reconstructability with the inverse Mojette transform (chap 4),” in The Mojette Transform: Theory and Applications, jeanpierre Guédon, Ed. iste & wiley, 2009, p. 15 pages.
- J. Guédon and N. Normand, “Direct Mojette transform (chap 3),” in The Mojette Transform: Theory and Applications, jeanpierre Guédon, Ed. iste & wiley, 2009, p. 23 pages.
- A. Kingston and F. Autrusseau, “Lossless compression (chap 9),” in The Mojette transform: Theory and Applications, jeanpierre Guédon, Ed. iste & wiley, 2009, p. 19 pages.
- A. Kingston, F. Autrusseau, E. Grall, T. Hamon, and B. Parrein, “Mojette based security (chap 10),” in The Mojette transform: Theory and Applications, J. Guédon, Ed. iste & wiley, 2009, p. 25 pages.
- A. Kingston, F. Autrusseau, and B. Parrein, “Multiresolution Mojette transform (chap 6),” in The Mojette transform: Theory and Applications, jeanpierre Guédon, Ed. iste & wiley, 2009, p. 29 pages.
- N. Normand, I. Svalbe, P. Evenou, and A. Kingston, “Inverse Mojette transform algorithms (chap 5),” in The Mojette Transform: Theory and Applications, J. Guédon, Ed. iste & wiley, 2009, p. 25 pages.
- B. Parrein, F. Boulos, N. Normand, and P. Evenou, “Communication, networks and storage (chap 7),” in The Mojette Transform: Theory and Applications, J. Guédon, Ed. iste & wiley, 2009, p. 29 pages.
- M. Servières, J. Guédon, N. Normand, and Y. Bizais, “Mojette discrete tomography (chap 8),” in The Mojette Transform: Theory and Applications, jeanpierre Guédon, Ed. iste & wiley, 2009, p. 29 pages.
- I. Svalbe and J. Guédon, “Discrete versions of the Radon Transform (chap 2),” in The Mojette Transform: Theory and Applications, jeanpierre Guédon, Ed. iste & wiley, 2009, p. 17 pages.
- J. Guédon, The Mojette transform. Theory and applications. ISTE-WILEY, 2009.
- S. Beaumont, J. Guédon, and Y. Ben Hdech, “Contrôle qualité dosimétrique des systèmes de planification de traitement : nouvelle méthode basée sur l’utilisation de PENELOPE et des Objets Tests Numériques anatomiques,” in Journées Scientifiques de la Société Française de Physique Médicale (SFPM), 2010, p. 1.
- Y. Ben Hdech, S. Beaumont, and J. Guédon, “Développement d’une méthode de Contrôle qualité des Systèmes de Planification des Traitements, utilisés en radiothérapie, au moyen du code Monte-Carlo PENELOPE et des Objets Tests Numériques,” in Journée des doctorants de l’École Doctorale STIM JDOC, 2010, p. 1.
- Y. Ben Hdech, S. Beaumont, J. Guédon, and T. Torfeh, “New method to perform dosimetric quality control of treatment planning system using PENELOPE Monte-Carlo and anatomical digital test objects,” in SPIE Medical Imaging 2010, 2010, vol. 7622, p. .
- Y. Amouriq, P. Evenou, A. Arlicot, N. Normand, and P. Layrolle, “Evaluation of trabecular bone patterns on dental radiographic images: influence of cortical bone,” in SPIE Medical Imaging, 2010, vol. 7626, p. 76261M.
- Y. Amouriq, P. Evenou, A. Arlicot, N. Normand, P. Layrolle, P. Weiss, and J. Guédon, “Evaluation of trabecular bone patterns on dental radiographic images: influence of cortical bone,” in SPIE Medical Imaging, 2010, p. 10 pages.
- A. Arlicot, Y. Amouriq, P. Evenou, N. Normand, and J. Guédon, “A single scan skeletonization algorithm: application to medical imaging of trabecular bone,” in SPIE Medical Imaging, 2010, vol. 7623, p. 762317.
- C. Zhang, J. Dong, J. Li, and F. Autrusseau, “A New Information Hiding Method for Image Watermarking Based on Mojette Transform,” in Second International Symposium on Networking and Network Security, 2010, pp. 124–128.
- N. Normand, I. Svalbe, B. Parrein, and A. Kingston, “Erasure Coding with the Finite Radon Transform,” in Wireless Communications & Networking Conference, 2010, pp. 1–6.
- S. S. Chandra, N. Normand, A. Kingston, J. Guédon, and I. Svalbe, “Fast Mojette Transform for Discrete Tomography,” 13-Jul-2012.
- J. Guédon, C. Liu, and J. Guédon, “The 2 and 3 materials scene reconstructed from some line Mojette projections,” in IEEE IPTA Conference, 2010, p. 6.
- Y. Amouriq, J. Guédon, N. Normand, A. Arlicot, Y. Ben Hdech, and P. Weiss, “Bone texture analysis on dental radiographic images: results with several angulated radiographs on the same region of interest,” in SPIE Medical Imaging 2011: Biomedical Applications in Molecular, Structural, and Functional Imaging, 2012, vol. 7965, p. 796525.
- S. Beaumont, T. Torfeh, R. Latreille, Y. Ben Hdech, and J. Guédon, “New method to test the gantry, collimator and table rotation angles of a linear accelerator used in radiation therapy,” in SPIE Medical Imaging 2011, 2011, vol. 7961, p. 796153.
- Y. Ben Hdech, S. Beaumont, J. Guédon, and C. Sylvain, “Dosimetric quality control of Eclipse treatment planning system using pelvic digital test object,” in Medical Imaging 2011: Physics of Medical Imaging, 2011, vol. 7961, p. 79613F.
- A. Arlicot, P. Evenou, and N. Normand, “Single-scan skeletonization driven by a neighborhood-sequence distance,” in International workshop on Combinatorial Image Analysis, IWCIA, 2011, pp. 61–72.
- A. Arlicot, N. Normand, Y. Amouriq, and J. Guédon, “Extraction of bone structure with a single-scan skeletonization driven by distance,” in First Sino-French Workshop on Education and Research collaborations in Information and Communication Technologies, SIFWICT, 2011, p. 2 pages.
- Y. Ben Hdech, D. Autret, S. Beaumont, and J. Guédon, “TPS dosimetric evaluation using 1540-IAEA Package and Monte-Carlo simulations,” in ESTRO International Oncology Forum, 2011, p. 1.
- C. Liu, J. Guédon, I. Svalbe, and Y. Amouriq, “Line Mojette ternary reconstructions and ghosts,” in IWCIA, 2011, p. 11.
- C. Liu and J. Guédon, “The limited material scenes reconstructed by line Mojette algorithms,” in Franco-Chinese conference, 2011, p. 2.
- J. Dong, L. Su, Y. Zhang, F. Autrusseau, and Y. Zhanbin, “Estimating Illumination Direction of 3D Surface Texture Based on Active Basis and Mojette Transform,” Journal of Electronic Imaging, vol. 21, no. 013023, p. 28 pages, Apr. 2012.
- D. Pertin, G. D’Ippolito, N. Normand, and B. Parrein, “Spatial Implementation for Erasure Coding by Finite Radon Transform,” in International Symposium on signal, Image, Video and Communication 2012, 2012, pp. 1–4.
- P. Bléry, Y. Amouriq, J. Guédon, P. Pilet, N. Normand, N. Durand, F. Espitalier, A. Arlicot, O. Malard, and P. Weiss, “Microarchitecture of irradiated bone: comparison with healthy bone,” in SPIE Medical Imaging, 2012, vol. 8317, p. 831719.
- S. Chandra, I. Svalbe, J. Guedon, A. Kingston, and N. Normand, “Recovering Missing Slices of the Discrete Fourier Transform using Ghosts,” IEEE Transactions on Image Processing, vol. 21, no. 10, pp. 4431–4441, Jul. 2012.
- H. Der Sarkissian, Jp. Guédon, P. Tervé, N. Normand and I. Svalbe. (2012)." Evaluation of Discrete Angles Rotation Degradation for Myocardial Perfusion Imaging", EANM Annual Congress 2012.
- C. Liu and J. Guédon, “Finding all solutions of the 3 materials problem,” in proceedings of SIFWICT, 2013, p. 6.
- B. Recur, H. Der Sarkissian, Jp. Guédon and I.Svalbe, "Tomosynthèse à l’aide de transformées discrètes", in Proceeding TAIMA 2013
- H. Der Sarkissian, B. Recur, N. Normand and Jp. Guédon, "Mojette space Transformations", in proceedings of SWIFCT 2013.
- B. Recur, H. Der Sarkissian, M. Servières, N.Normand, Jp. Guédon, "Validation of Mojette Reconstruction from Radon Acquisitions" in Proceedings of 2013 IEEE International Conference on Image Processing.
- H. Der Sarkissian, B. Recur, N. Normand, Jp. Guédon. (2013), "Rotations in the Mojette Space" in 2013 IEEE International Conference on Image Processing.
