= GPFS =

High-performance clustered file system

- Developer: IBM
- Full name: IBM Spectrum Scale
- Introduced: 1998; 28 years ago with AIX

Limits
- Max volume size: 8 YB
- Max file size: 8 EB
- Max no. of files: 2^{64} per file system

Features
- File system permissions: POSIX
- Transparent encryption: yes

Other
- Supported operating systems: AIX, Linux, Windows Server

GPFS (General Parallel File System, brand name IBM Storage Scale and previously IBM Spectrum Scale) is a high-performance clustered file system software developed by IBM. It can be deployed in shared-disk or shared-nothing distributed parallel modes, or a combination of these. It is used by many of the world's largest commercial companies, as well as some of the supercomputers on the Top 500 List.

Like typical cluster filesystems, GPFS provides concurrent high-speed file access to applications executing on multiple nodes of clusters. It can be used with AIX clusters, Linux clusters, on Microsoft Windows Server, or a heterogeneous cluster of AIX, Linux and Windows nodes running on x86, Power or IBM Z processor architectures.

== History ==
GPFS began as the Tiger Shark file system, a research project at IBM's Almaden Research Center as early as 1993. Tiger Shark was initially designed to support high throughput multimedia applications. This design turned out to be well suited to scientific computing.

Another ancestor is IBM's Vesta filesystem, developed as a research project at IBM's Thomas J. Watson Research Center between 1992 and 1995. Vesta introduced the concept of file partitioning to accommodate the needs of parallel applications that run on high-performance multicomputers with parallel I/O subsystems. With partitioning, a file is not a sequence of bytes, but rather multiple disjoint sequences that may be accessed in parallel. The partitioning is such that it abstracts away the number and type of I/O nodes hosting the filesystem, and it allows a variety of logically partitioned views of files, regardless of the physical distribution of data within the I/O nodes. The disjoint sequences are arranged to correspond to individual processes of a parallel application, allowing for improved scalability.

Vesta was commercialized as the PIOFS filesystem around 1994, and was succeeded by GPFS around 1998. The main difference between the older and newer filesystems was that GPFS replaced the specialized interface offered by Vesta/PIOFS with the standard Unix API: all the features to support high performance parallel I/O were hidden from users and implemented under the hood. GPFS also shared many components with the related products IBM Multi-Media Server and IBM Video Charger, which is why many GPFS utilities start with the prefix mm—multi-media.

In 2010, IBM previewed a version of GPFS that included a capability known as GPFS-SNC, where SNC stands for Shared-Nothing Cluster. This was officially released with GPFS 3.5 in December 2012, and is now known as FPO (File Placement Optimizer).

== Architecture ==
It is a clustered file system. It breaks a file into blocks of a configured size, less than 1 megabyte each, which are distributed across multiple cluster nodes.

The system stores data on standard block storage volumes, but includes an internal RAID layer that can virtualize those volumes for redundancy and parallel access much like a RAID block storage system. It also has the ability to replicate across volumes at the higher file level.

Features of the architecture include

- Distributed metadata, including the directory tree. There is no single "directory controller" or "index server" in charge of the filesystem.
- Efficient indexing of directory entries for very large directories.
- Distributed locking. This allows for full POSIX filesystem semantics, including locking for exclusive file access.
- Partition Aware. A failure of the network may partition the filesystem into two or more groups of nodes that can only see the nodes in their group. This can be detected through a heartbeat protocol, and when a partition occurs, the filesystem remains live for the largest partition formed. This offers a graceful degradation of the filesystem — some machines will remain working.
- Filesystem maintenance can be performed online. Most of the filesystem maintenance chores (adding new disks, rebalancing data across disks) can be performed while the filesystem is live. This maximizes the filesystem availability, and thus the availability of the supercomputer cluster itself.

Other features include high availability, ability to be used in a heterogeneous cluster, disaster recovery, security, DMAPI, HSM and ILM.

=== Compared to Hadoop Distributed File System (HDFS) ===
Hadoop's HDFS filesystem, is designed to store similar or greater quantities of data on commodity hardware — that is, datacenters without RAID disks and a storage area network (SAN).

- HDFS also breaks files up into blocks, and stores them on different filesystem nodes.
- GPFS has full Posix filesystem semantics.
- GPFS distributes its directory indices and other metadata across the filesystem. Hadoop, in contrast, keeps this on the Primary and Secondary Namenodes, large servers which must store all index information in-RAM.
- GPFS breaks files up into small blocks. Hadoop HDFS likes blocks of 64 MB or more, as this reduces the storage requirements of the Namenode. Small blocks or many small files fill up a filesystem's indices fast, so limit the filesystem's size.

== Information lifecycle management ==
Storage pools allow for the grouping of disks within a file system. An administrator can create tiers of storage by grouping disks based on performance, locality or reliability characteristics. For example, one pool could be high-performance Fibre Channel disks and another more economical SATA storage.

A fileset is a sub-tree of the file system namespace and provides a way to partition the namespace into smaller, more manageable units. Filesets provide an administrative boundary that can be used to set quotas and be specified in a policy to control initial data placement or data migration. Data in a single fileset can reside in one or more storage pools. Where the file data resides and how it is migrated is based on a set of rules in a user defined policy.

There are two types of user defined policies: file placement and file management. File placement policies direct file data as files are created to the appropriate storage pool. File placement rules are selected by attributes such as file name, the user name or the fileset. File management policies allow the file's data to be moved or replicated or files to be deleted. File management policies can be used to move data from one pool to another without changing the file's location in the directory structure. File management policies are determined by file attributes such as last access time, path name or size of the file.

The policy processing engine is scalable and can be run on many nodes at once. This allows management policies to be applied to a single file system with billions of files and complete in a few hours.

== Example sites ==
- Summitat Oak Ridge National Laboratory, the #1 fastest supercomputer in the world in the November 2019 Top 500 list.

== See also ==
- Alluxio
- ASM Cluster File System (ACFS)
- BeeGFS
- GFS2
- Gluster
- Google File System
- List of file systems
- Lustre (file system)
- MapR FS
- MooseFS
- OCFS2
- Panasas PanFS
- QFS
- IBM Scale-out File Services – NAS-grid
- Shared-disk file system
- Veritas Cluster Server
- ZFS
