= PVFS =

PVFS may refer to:

- Post-viral fatigue syndrome, a condition resulting from a viral infection
- Parallel Virtual File System, a type of distributed file system
