= Hammerkit =

HAMMERKIT
- Company type: Private
- Industry: Internet
- Founded: 2006
- Headquarters: Helsinki, Finland & Liverpool, England
- Products: Web Formats CloudStore

Hammerkit is a company which has developed a platform as a service (PaaS) which allows web formats and repeatable solutions to be created and distributed globally using its CloudStore.

== History ==
Hammerkit was a piece of software first developed by Jani Vähäsöyrinki, Heikki Luhtala, and Ari Tenhunen between 2002 and 2006. This team was joined by Robin Lindroos and these four became the core team of driving the development of Hammerkit as a web application development platform. A detailed history of the founding and early years of the Hammerkit platform and the players involved has been published by Ari Tenhunen. The initial ideas started as a spin-off of Njet Commununications' Anvil project to develop a Java development language to make development of Java applications faster and easier. The team of Vähäsöyrinki, Luhtala and Tenhunen could see that the Composer application in Anvil was still too complex for web designers to use and set about creating a new toolset that became Hammerkit. It was the first truly component-based web application builder available on the web. From 2002 to 2006, the new versions were release up to v3.5. A final release of Hammerkit v3.x was published in 2007.

The team chose the name Hammerkit simply because they liked the simplicity of a hammer (everyone knows how to use one) and because of its association with the project Anvil name.

In 2006, Hammerkit Oy was established to commercialise the software. Mark Sorsa-Leslie joined the team in October 2007 as Managing Director and in December 2008, the company was named as a Red Herring Global 100 award winner. In July 2010, Hammerkit debuted version 4.0 of their platform. The major enhancement in v4.0 was the move to a fully hosted architecture and the renewal of the user interface to utilise drag and drop design rather than the previous point and click approach.

In December 2011, Hammerkit announced a new funding round to internationalize the business. A new office was opened in Liverpool, England and a new product, the CloudStore was launched to support the creation, reuse and distribution of web formats as repeatable web solutions. The concept is based on the approach utilised in the TV industry to create global formats that are localized for particular markets. Hammerkit now specialises in the creation of web formats for the global public relations industry, serving clients such as Edelman and Hill+Knowlton Strategies. The company was noted by Nick Jones, head of Digital at the UK prime minister's office and the cabinet office as an example of a technology that will deskill the task of creating web services in his view from Downing Street 2011 published in The Drum.

In late 2011, the company was announced as one of five winners of a World Summit Award in the e-business and commerce category together with Star, Monaqasat, Hootsuite and Aeroscan.

In March 2012, Hammerkit launched Hammerkit.org as a community-based platform to promote the creation and sharing of repeatable digital solutions.

In 2013, Hammerkit is populating its CloudStore with off-the-shelf applications for the PR industry to choose from. Hammerkit will carry on designing and developing websites for companies using its Hammerkit Studio.

== Awards ==
- 2009 – Mindtrek Startup Launchpad Winner
- 2010 – Mindtrek World Summit Award 2010 Finnish Winner – e-business/e-commerce
- 2011 – World Summit Award Global Winner – best e-business/e-commerce application

== See also ==
- Web application framework
- Web interoperability
