= ACFS =

ACFS may refer to:

- ASM Cluster File System, in computing
- Advisory Council of Faculty Senates, Florida, US

== See also ==
- ACF (disambiguation)
