= Fileset =

Defined set of computer files

In computing, a fileset is a set of computer files linked by defining property or common characteristic. There are different types of fileset though the context will usually give the defining characteristic. Sometimes it is necessary to explicitly state the fileset type to avoid ambiguity, an example is the emacs editor which explicitly mentions its Version Control (VC) fileset type to distinguish from its "named files" fileset type.

== Fileset types ==
While there is probably no classification of fileset types some common usage cases do emerge:

- A fileset type where the set of files in the fileset are simply enumerated or selected, as an example in the way named filesets are constructed in emacs.
- The set of files included in a software installation package is used in both the AIX operating system installation packaging system, and the HP-UX packaging system.
- For fileset types relating to filesystems there may be a relationship to directories. In terms of Namespace Database (NSDB) Protocol for Federated File Systems:
  A fileset is loosely defined as a set of files and the directory tree that contains them. The fileset abstraction is the basic unit of data management. Depending on the configuration, a fileset may be anything from an individual directory of an exported file system to an entire exported file system on a fileserver
  — RFC 5732
- In coding forms some libraries may define a fileset object type, typically as a case specific name Fileset, or FileSet which is used to hold an object which references a set of files.

== Specific examples ==
Fileset has several meanings and usages, depending on the context. Some examples are:

In the AIX operating system installation packaging system it is the smallest individually installable unit (a collection of files that provides a specific function).

DCE/DFS uses the term fileset to define a tree containing directories, files, and mount points (links to other DFS filesets). A DFS fileset is also a unit of administrative control. Properties such as data location, storage quota, and replication are controlled at this level of granularity. The concept of a fileset in DFS is essentially identical to the concept of a volume in AFS. The glamor filesystem uses the same concept of filesets. Filesets are lightweight components compared to file systems, so management of a file set is easier.

In IBM GPFS represents a set of files within a file system which have an independent inode space.
