= DMAPI =

Data Management API (DMAPI) is the interface defined in the X/Open document "Systems Management: Data Storage Management (XDSM) API" dated February 1997. XFS, IBM JFS, VxFS, AdvFS, StorNext and IBM Spectrum Scale file systems support DMAPI for Hierarchical Storage Management (HSM).
