= LizardFS =

Distributed file system

- Developer: Distributed FS Sp. z o.o.
- Final release: 3.12.0 / 21 December 2017; 8 years ago
- Operating system: Linux, FreeBSD, Mac OS X, Solaris
- Type: Distributed file system
- License: GPLv3
- Website: LizardFS.com (Archived)
- Repository: github.com/lizardfs/lizardfs

LizardFS is an open-source distributed file system that is POSIX-compliant and licensed under GPLv3. It was released in 2013 as a fork of MooseFS.

LizardFS is a distributed, scalable and fault-tolerant file system. The file system is designed so that it is possible to add more disks and servers "on the fly," without the need for any server reboots or shutdowns.

As of 2026, LizardFS's commercial support is now defunct, with the project's official website no longer in service.

== Description ==
LizardFS makes files secure by keeping all the data in multiple replicas spread over the available servers. This storage is presented to the end user as a single logical namespace. It can also be used to build space-efficient storage because it is designed to run on commodity hardware. It has applications in multiple fields and is used by institutions in finance, telecommunications, medicine, education, post-production, game development, and cloud hosting services.

== Hardware ==
LizardFS is fully hardware-agnostic. Commodity hardware can be utilized for cost efficiency. The minimum requirements are two dedicated nodes with a number of disks, but to obtain a highly available installation, at least three nodes are needed. This will also enable the use of erasure coding.

== Architecture ==
LizardFS keeps metadata (e.g., file names, modification timestamps, directory trees) and the data separately. Metadata is kept on metadata servers, while data is kept on chunkservers.

A typical installation consists of:

- At least two metadata servers, which work in the master-slave mode for failure recovery. Their role is to manage the whole installation, so the active metadata server is often called the master server. The role of other metadata servers is to keep in sync with the active master server, so they are typically called shadow master servers. Any shadow master server is ready to take the role of the master server at any time. A suggested configuration of a metadata server is a machine with a fast CPU, at least 32 GB of RAM and at least one drive (preferably SSD) to store several gigabytes of metadata.
- A set of chunkservers that store the data. Each file is divided into blocks called chunks (each up to 64 MB) which are stored on the chunkservers. A suggested configuration of a chunkserver is a machine with large disk space available either in a JBOD or RAID configuration. CPU and RAM are not very important. You can have as few as two chunkservers or as many as hundreds of them.
- Clients who use the data stored on LizardFS. These machines use a LizardFS mount to access files in the installation and process them just like those on their local hard drives. Files stored on LizardFS can be accessed by as many clients as needed.

== Features ==
LizardFS manages data durability through the replication goals assigned to individual files or folders. Administrators can choose how many complete chunk copies to preserve across each physical node. LizardFS also features geo-replication and topology awareness, which enables assigning location labels to chunkservers, which allows the cluster to spread replicas across data centers while still prioritizing local reads for clients.

For storage administration, LizardFS supports copy-on-write snapshots that duplicate files metadata while sharing unchanged underlying chunks. Also included is Quality of Service (QoS) bandwidth throttling per mount point or process group, POSIX style soft and hard disk quotas, and a deletion functionality that retains deleted files for a configurable retention period before permanently deleting them. A java-based plugin provides a File System Abstraction Layer that enables Apache Hadoop (YARN and MapReduce) workloads to run directly against a LizardFS cluster.

== History ==
LizardFS was created in 2013 as an open-source fork of MooseFS, by a Polish development team backed by the IT company Skytechnology (later operating as Distributed FS Sp. z o.o.)

It has seen adoption by institutions such as:

- The Joint Institute for Nuclear Research (JINR) deployed a LizardFS based network file system for its cloud infrastructure, hosting virtual machine images and user data.
- The French national research institute Inria utilized LizardFS for the distributed storage layer for its Guix-HPC scientific computing cluster.

As of October 24, 2026, the official website for the project and commercial services for LizardFS is no longer in service, replaced by a parked domain page. The GitHub project has not seen a new official release since December 2017 (3.12.0).

== See also ==
- Hyper-converged infrastructure
- Distributed file system
- List of file systems#Distributed parallel fault-tolerant file systems
- MooseFS
- BeeGFS
