= IBM Scale-out File Services =

Computer storage technologies

IBM SoFS
- Developer(s): IBM
- Stable release: 1.5 / August 2008
- Operating system: RHEL 5.2
- Type: Network-attached Storage
- License: Proprietary
- Website: www.ibm.com

Scale out File Services (SoFS) is a highly scalable, grid-based network-attached storage (NAS) implementation developed by IBM. It is based on IBM's high-performance shared-disk clustered file system Spectrum Scale. SoFS exports the clustered file system through industry standard protocols like Server Message Block, Network File System, File Transfer Protocol and Hypertext Transfer Protocol. Released in 2007, SoFS is a second generation file services architecture used within IBM since 2001.

All of the SoFS nodes in the grid export all files of all file systems simultaneously. This is a different approach from some other clustered NAS implementations which pin individual files to a single node or pair of nodes thus limiting the single file performance dramatically. Each file system can be multiple petabytes in size.

SoFS combines proprietary IBM technology (block storage and compute servers and Spectrum Scale) with open source components including Linux, Samba, and CTDB.

Since February 2010, IBM is offering a hardened appliance version of SoFS, called Scale Out Network Attached Storage (SONAS). SONAS includes a subset of the described software stack plus a new management layer. Major differences are a strict hardware support matrix, integrated high-density disk storage, and a delivery model with a standard IBM product warranty. Technically, SONAS uses an internal Infiniband network to get low latency and high cluster throughput. The cluster architecture is derived from leading Top500 supercomputer designs.

== See also ==
- IBM Spectrum Scale
- Lustre (file system)
