= ACF =

ACF or acf may refer to:

== Organizations ==
=== Asia ===
- Adivasi Cobra Force, extremist Santal organisation in Assam
- Arab Chess Federation
- Asian Chess Federation

=== Australia ===
- Australian Cat Federation, a standards organization for cat breeds
- Australian Chess Federation, the governing body for chess in Australia
- Australian Conservation Foundation, an Australian non-profit promoting ecological sustainability

=== Europe ===
- Action contre la Faim or Action Against Hunger, global humanitarian organization
- ACF Fiorentina, Associazione Calcio Fiorentina, Italian football club
- Army Cadet Force, British youth organisation that offers progressive military training to boys and girls aged 12 to 18
- Ateliers et Chantiers de France, defunct French shipyard
- Automobile Club of France, men's club located on Place de la Concorde in Paris

=== North America ===
- Academic Competition Federation, an unincorporated non-profit organization that runs collegiate quizbowl tournaments
- Administration for Children and Families, the operating unit of the US Department of Health and Human Services
- American Car and Foundry Company, a manufacturer of railroad rolling stock since 1899, now known as ACF Industries
- American Checker Federation, a non-profit governing the game of American checkers in the US
- American Culinary Federation, a professional chefs' organization established in 1929

=== Others ===
- Active Citizen Force, temporary conscripts and volunteers in the South African Army
- Anti-Corruption Foundation, an international NGO founded by Russian opposition figure Alexei Navalny
- Associação Chapecoense de Futebol, a Brazilian football club

== Science and technology ==
=== Electronics and computing ===
- Access Control Facility, a prototype of the ACF2 third-party security software for IBM OS/VS
- Anisotropic conductive film, a conductive adhesive system used in the electronics industry

=== Medicine ===
- ACF (gene)
- Aberrant crypt foci, a preneoplastic lesion on the mucosa of the colon or rectum
- Asymmetric crying facies, a minor congenital anomaly

=== Other sciences ===
- Meade Advanced Coma-Free telescope design
- Autocorrelation function in time series statistics

== Other uses ==
- ACF River Basin, Apalachicola-Chattahoochee-Flint River Basin in the southeastern US
- Aircraft railway station, station code, Melbourne
- Saint Lucian Creole French (ISO 639:acf), a French-based creole language spoken in Saint Lucia and Dominica
- Aral Talim Airport, IATA code ACF

== See also ==
- ACFS (disambiguation)
