= MapR FS =

Clustered file system

MapR FS Features
- Developer: MapR
- Full name: MapR FS
- Introduced: 2011 with Linux

Structures
- Directory contents: B-tree
- File allocation: Multi-level B-tree

Limits
- Max volume size: unlimited
- Max file size: 16 EiB
- Max no. of files: unlimited

Features
- File system permissions: Standard Unix, Access Control expressions
- Transparent compression: Yes
- Transparent encryption: Yes

Other
- Supported operating systems: Linux

The MapR File System (MapR FS) is a clustered file system that supports both very large-scale and high-performance uses. MapR FS supports a variety of interfaces including conventional read/write file access via NFS and a FUSE interface, as well as via the HDFS interface used by many systems such as Apache Hadoop and Apache Spark. In addition to file-oriented access, MapR FS supports access to tables and message streams using the Apache HBase and Apache Kafka APIs, as well as via a document database interface.

First released in 2010, MapR FS is now typically described as the MapR Converged Data Platform due to the addition of tabular and messaging interfaces. The same core technology is, however, used to implement all of these forms of persistent data storage and all of the interfaces are ultimately supported by the same server processes. To distinguish the different capabilities of the overall data platform, the term MapR FS is used more specifically to refer to the file-oriented interfaces, MapR DB or MapR JSON DB is used to refer to the tabular interfaces and MapR Streams is used to describe the message streaming capabilities.

MapR FS is a cluster filesystem that provides uniform access from files to other objects such as tables used as universal namespace accessible from any client of the system. Access control is also provided for files, tables and streams used as access control expressions, which is an extension of the more common (and limited) access control list that allow permissions from composed lists of allowed users or groups, but boolean instead allow combinations of user id and groups.

== History ==
MapR FS was developed in 2009 by MapR Technologies to extend the capabilities of Apache Hadoop by providing a more performant and stable platform. The design of MapR FS is influenced by various other systems such as the Andrew File System (AFS). The concept of volumes in AFS has some strong similarity from the point of the view of users, although the implementation in MapR FS is completely different. One major difference between AFS and MapR FS is that the latter uses a strong consistency model while AFS provides only weak consistency.

To meet the original goals of supporting Hadoop programs, MapR FS supports the HDFS API by translating HDFS function calls into an internal API based on a custom remote procedure call (RPC) mechanism. The normal write-once model of HDFS is replaced in MapR FS by a fully mutable file system even when using the HDFS API. The ability to support file mutation allows the implementation of an NFS server that translates NFS operations into internal MapR RPC calls. Similar mechanisms are used to allow a Filesystem in Userspace (FUSE) interface and an approximate emulation of the Apache HBase API.

== Architecture ==
Files in MapR FS are internally implemented by splitting the file contents into chunks, typically each 256 MB in size although the size is specific to each file. Each chunk is written to containers which are the element of replication in the cluster. Containers are replicated and the replication is done by either linear fashion in which each replica forwards write operations to the next replica in line or in a star pattern in which the master replica forwards write operations to all other replicas at the same time. Writes are acknowledged by the master replica when all writes to all replicas complete. Internally, containers implement B-trees which are used at multiple levels such as to map file offset to chunk within a file or to map file offset to the correct 8kB block within a chunk.

These B-trees are also used to implement directories. A long hash of each file or directory name in the directory is used to find the child file or directory table.

A volume is a special data structure similar to a directory in many ways, except that it allows additional access control and management operations. A notable capability of volumes is that the nodes on which a volume may reside within a cluster can be restricted to control performance, particularly in heavily contended multi-tenant systems that are running a wide variety of workloads.

Proprietary technology is used in MapR FS to implement transactions in containers and to achieve consistent crash recovery.

Other features of the filesystem include:

- Distributed cluster metadata, including the location of all containers and their arrangement into replication chains.
- Distributed metadata, including the directory tree. All directories are fully replicated and no single node contains all of the meta-data for the cluster.
- Efficient use of B-trees to achieve high performance even with very large directories.
- Partition tolerance. A cluster can be partitioned without loss of consistency, although availability may be compromised. Restricted consistency replication across multiple clusters is also supported using volume mirrors, and near real-time replication of tables and streams.
- Consistent multi-threaded update. Files can be updated or read by very many threads of control simultaneously without requiring global locking structures.
- Rolling upgrades and online filesystem maintenance. Almost all maintenance including major version upgrades can be performed while the cluster continues to operate at nearly full speed.

== See also ==
- GFS2
- Gluster
- Google File System
- List of file systems
- Lustre (file system)
- MooseFS
- OCFS2
- QFS
- RozoFS
- Shared-disk file system
- ZFS
