= Kristeligt Forbund for Studerende =

Kristeligt Forbund for Studerende (KFS) is a Danish Christian student movement, founded in 1956. KFS is a member of the International Fellowship of Evangelical Students (IFES), but unlike most IFES-members, KFS is officially Lutheran, not interdenominational.
