= Institut de Recherche en Communications et Cybernétique de Nantes =

French research institute

Coordinates: 47.2502°N 1.5475°W

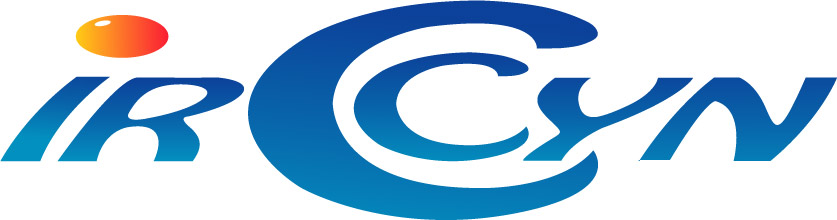
- Established: 1958; 68 years ago
- Chair: Michel Malabre
- Faculty: Université de Nantes
- Staff: 292
- Address: 1 rue de la Noé - 44300 Nantes
- Location: Nantes, France
- Website: www.ls2n.fr

The Institut de Recherche en Communications et Cybernétique de Nantes (IRCCyN, English : Research Institute in Communications and Cybernetic of Nantes) is a scientific institution linked to the CNRS in France. Its purpose is to innovate in different fields such as robotics, automatic control, cognition, production theory and image processing. The IRCCyN is a dedicated center for the université de Nantes, the école des Mines de Nantes and the école centrale de Nantes where it is located.

The IRCCyN was founded in 1958 by Professor Romane Mezencev and joined the CNRS in 1968. Michel Malabre is the director of the institute since 2008.

The activity and results of the IRCCyN is evaluated every 5 years by the "High Council of Evaluation of Research and Higher Education" and the National Committee of Scientific Research.
