= Oracle Cloud File System =

Storage cluster management software

Oracle Cloud File System (CloudFS) is a storage management suite developed by Oracle Corporation. CloudFS consists of a cluster file system called ASM Cluster File System (ACFS), and a cluster volume manager called ASM Dynamic Volume Manager (ADVM) initially released in August 2007.

== Features ==
ACFS is a standard-based POSIX (Linux, UNIX) and Windows cluster file system with full cluster-wide file and memory mapped I/O cache coherency and file locking. ACFS provides direct I/O for Oracle database I/O workloads. ACFS implements indirect I/O however for general purpose files that typically perform small I/O for better response time. CloudFS is designed to scale to billions of files and supports very large file and file systems sizes (up to exabytes of storage).

CloudFS is built on top of Oracle Automatic Storage Management (ASM) and Oracle clustering technologies to provide cluster volume and file services to clients. ADVM and ACFS leverage ASM striping, mirroring and automatic I/O rebalancing features to manage volumes that are dynamically resizable.

Starting with the latest release in Oracle Database 12c, ACFS supports Oracle database files as well as general purpose files.

ACFS supports space efficient read-write snapshots, asynchronous file system replication, tagging for aggregate operations, fine grain security and encryption for higher security.
