= Swiss Cancer Research Foundation =

Swiss cancer organization

Swiss Cancer Research
- Company type: Foundation
- Founded: 1990
- Headquarters: Bern, Schweiz
- Key people: Jakob Passweg (president), Peggy Janich (managing director)
- Website: www.cancerresearch.ch

The Swiss Cancer Research Foundation (German: "Krebsforschung Schweiz", abbreviated "KFS") is a foundation under Swiss law based in Bern, which was founded in 1990. It promotes research projects aimed at improving the survival and quality of life of patients with cancer.
