= CloudStore =

Distributed file system

CloudStore (KFS, previously Kosmosfs) was Kosmix's C++ implementation of the Google File System. It parallels the Hadoop project, which is implemented in the Java programming language. CloudStore supports incremental scalability, replication, checksumming for data integrity, client side fail-over and access from C++, Java and Python. There is a FUSE module so that the file system can be mounted on Linux.

In September 2007, Kosmix published Kosmosfs as open source. The last commit activity was in 2010. The Google Code page for Kosmosfs now points to the Quantcast File System on GitHub which is the successor to KFS. A former project on SourceForge used the name CloudStore in 2008.

== See also ==
- Google File System
- List of file systems
- GlusterFS
- Moose File System
