= Amazon S3 Glacier =

Online file archival and backup service

- Website type: Online backup service
- Available in: English
- Owner: Amazon.com
- Website: aws.amazon.com/glacier/
- Commercial: Yes
- Registration: Required
- Launched: August 21, 2012
- Current status: Active

Amazon S3 Glacier is an online file storage web service that provides storage for data archiving and backup.

Glacier is part of the Amazon Web Services suite of cloud computing services, and is designed for long-term storage of data that is infrequently accessed and for which standard retrieval latency times of 12 to 48 hours are acceptable. Base monthly storage costs are $0.00099/GB or about $1/TB (East Coast USA Prices). This is substantially cheaper than the Simple Storage Service (S3) Standard tier with its nearly instant egress times.

Amazon aims to move customers from on-premises tape backup drives to cloud-based backup.

== Storage ==
The storage technology used by Glacier, indeed for all of S3, is an Amazon trade secret. It is subject to speculation.

Amazon officially states in their S3 FAQS:

Q: What is the backend infrastructure supporting the S3 Glacier Flexible Retrieval and S3 Glacier Deep Archive storage class?

We prefer to focus on the customer outcomes of performance, durability, availability, and security. However, this question is often asked by our customers. We use a number of different technologies which allow us to offer the prices we do to our customers. Our services are built using common data storage technologies specifically assembled into purpose-built, cost-optimized systems using AWS-developed software. The S3 Glacier storage classes benefit from our ability to optimize the sequence of inputs and outputs to maximize efficiency accessing the underlying storage.

ZDNet says, that according to private e-mail, Glacier runs on "inexpensive commodity hardware components". In 2012, ZDNet quoted a former Amazon employee as saying that Glacier is based on custom low-RPM hard drives attached to custom logic boards where only a percentage of a rack's drives can be spun at full speed at any one time. Similar technology is also used by Facebook.

There is speculation that the service is tape-based, because Amazon has positioned Glacier as a direct competitor to tape backup services, both on-premises and cloud-based. This is supported by the fact that Glacier has a long archive retrieval of up to 12 hours, called "thawing", and a pricing model that discourages frequent data retrieval - the consequence of multiple user request batching, to reduce wear on drive heads that can read multiple requests in a single pass.

The Register claimed in 2012 that Glacier ran on Spectra T-Finity tape libraries with LTO-6 tapes. Others have conjectured Amazon uses off-line shingled magnetic recording hard drives, multi-layer Blu-ray optical discs, or an alternative proprietary storage technology. Data storage consultant Robin Harris speculated that the storage is based on cheap optical discs such as Blu-ray, based on hints from public sources.

== Cost ==
The prices for monthly storage have dropped over 50% since Glacier launched in 2012.

Glacier previously charged for retrievals based on peak monthly retrieval rate, that (ignoring the free tier) to download four gigabytes in four hours cost the same as 720 gigabytes in 720 hours, in a 30-day month. This pricing policy was widely regarded as a "time bomb" set to go off on retrieval.

In 2016, AWS revised the retrieval pricing model.
