= Active Archive Alliance =

Trade association

- Formation: 2010
- Type: Industry trade group
- Purpose: Promoting active archive
- Website: activearchive.com

The Active Archive Alliance is a trade association that promotes a method of tiered storage. This method provides users access to data across a virtual file system that migrates data between multiple storage systems and media types including solid-state drive/flash, hard disk drives, magnetic tape, optical disk, and cloud. The result of an active archive implementation is that data can be stored on the most appropriate media type for the given retention and restoration requirements of that data. This allows less time sensitive or infrequently accessed data to be stored on less expensive media and eliminates the need for an administrator to manually migrate data between storage systems. Additionally, since storage systems such as tape libraries have low power consumption, the operational expense of storing data in an active archive is significantly reduced.

Active archives provide organizations with a persistent view of the data in their archives and make it easy to access files whenever needed. Active archives take advantage of metadata to keep track of where primary, secondary, and tertiary copies of data reside within the system so as to maintain online accessibility to any given file in a file system, regardless of the storage medium being utilized. The impetus for active archive applications, or the software involved in an active archive, was the growing amount of unstructured data in the typical data center and the need to be able to manage and efficiently store that data. As a result, active archive applications tend to be focused on file systems and unstructured data, rather than all collective data; however, many have features and functions that address traditional backup needs as well.

Active archives provide online access, searchability and retrieval of long-term data and enable virtually unlimited scalability to accommodate future growth. In addition, active archives enhance the business value of the data by enabling users to directly access the data online, search it and use it for their business purposes.

== Description ==
Since an active archive is built around a cost-performance ratio, the performance standards of these systems vary significantly based on each individual implementation. Within an active archive the quantities and types of media used are determined by the retention and access requirements of the varying types of data. This gives a company the flexibility to determine their own tolerance levels for accessing any given type of data. However, in general, active archive systems can recall data to a use ranging from milliseconds to 2 minutes, depending on what type of media the data is residing.

Because an active archive is being used for storing both primary, secondary, and tertiary copies of data there are several factors that become necessary for the implementation of an active archive beyond simply the ability to move and access data: data integrity, media monitoring, energy efficiency, and interoperability are all important components of an active archive. Many active archive components include features such as self-healing data within the software, versioning, encryption, and media health monitoring. Since an active archive is also being used as an archive, features such as automatic migration between storage devices and technologies, vendor neutral formatting, and ILM management are all important components to an active archive as well. Many of these standards are driven due to specific industry compliance requirements such as HIPAA, SOX, PCI Compliance, etc.

== Comparison to hierarchical storage management ==
While active archiving is often compared to hierarchical storage management (HSM), the two methods have very different implementations. Unlike an HSM, data in an active archive remains online regardless of the age or usage. The access pattern in an active archive is also different than a traditional HSM in that the data is not automatically restored to the "higher tier" storage system when requested, but rather is accessed directly from the storage device that the data is resting on. This makes every storage device in an active archive both primary storage and archival storage.

An active archive is an archive in the sense that it manages the data within the active archive throughout the lifecycle of that data according to each company's particular Information Lifecycle Management (ILM) policies and procedures. This means that while the active archive serves as the primary storage pool, it is also the final storage location for a file at the same time.

== The alliance ==
The Active Archive Alliance is a trade organization promoting active archives for simplified, online access to all data. It was formed in April 2010 by Compellent (later acquired by Dell), FileTek, QStar Technologies, and Spectra Logic. The alliance is open to providers of active archive technologies including file systems, active archive applications, cloud storage, and high-density tape and disk storage, as well as individuals and end-users. Current members/sponsors include Fujifilm, IBM, Iron Mountain, Quantum Corporation, Spectra Logic, Western Digital, and some others.
