= Xsan =

Storage area network by Apple

- Developer: Apple Inc.
- Release: January 4, 2005
- Stable release: 5.0.1 (included in macOS Server 5.11.1 released December 14, 2020)
- Operating system: macOS
- Type: Shared-disk file system
- License: Proprietary
- Website: Apple Developer Documentation

Xsan (/ˈɛksæn/) is Apple Inc.'s storage area network (SAN) or clustered file system for macOS. Xsan enables multiple Mac desktop and Xserve systems to access shared block storage over a Fibre Channel network. With the Xsan file system installed, these computers can read and write to the same storage volume at the same time. Xsan is a complete SAN solution that includes the metadata controller software, the file system client software, and integrated setup, management and monitoring tools.

Xsan has all the normal features to be expected in an enterprise shared-disk file system, including support for large files and file systems, multiple mounted file systems, metadata controller failover for fault tolerance, and support for multiple operating systems.

== Interoperability ==
Xsan is based on the StorNext File System made by Quantum Corporation. The StorNext File System and the Xsan file system share the same file system layout and the same protocol when talking to the metadata server. They also seem to share a common code base or very close development based on the new features developed for both file systems.

The Xsan website claims complete interoperability with the StorNext File System: "And because Xsan is completely interoperable with Quantum’s StorNext File System, you can even provide clients on Windows, Linux, and other UNIX platforms with direct Fibre Channel block-level access to the data in your Xsan-managed storage pool."

Quantum Corporation claims: "Complete interoperability with Apple’s Xsan and Promise RAID and Allows Xsan and Xserve RAID to support AIX, HP-UX, IRIX, Red Hat Linux, SuSE Linux, Mac OS X, Solaris, and Windows clients, including support for 64 Bit Windows and Windows Vista."

Some of the command line tools for Xsan begin with the letters cv, which stand for CentraVision – the original name for the file system. XSan clients use TCP ports 49152–65535, with TCP/63146 frequently showing in log files.

== Data representation ==
Xsan file system uses several logical stores to distribute information. The two main classes of information appear on Xsan: the user data (such as files) and the file system metadata (such as folders, file names, file allocation information and so on). Most configurations use different stores for data and metadata. The file system supports dynamic expansion and distribution of both data and metadata areas.

== History ==
Box artwork for Xsan versions 1.0–1.4

On January 4, 2005, Apple announced shipping of Xsan.

In May 2006, Apple released Xsan 1.2 with support for volume sizes of nearly 2 petabytes.

On August 7, 2006, Apple announced Xsan 1.4, which is available for Intel-based Macintosh computers as a Universal binary and supports file system access control lists.

On December 5, 2006, Apple released Xsan 1.4.1.

On October 18, 2007, Apple released Xsan 1.4.2, which resolves several reliability and compatibility issues.

On February 19, 2008, Apple released Xsan 2, the first major update, which introduces MultiSAN, and completely redesigned administration tools. 2.1 was introduced on June 10, 2008. 2.1.1 was introduced on October 15, 2008. 2.2 was released September 14, 2009.

On July 20, 2011, Apple released Xsan 2.3, included in Mac OS X Lion. This was the first version of Xsan included with macOS.

On August 25, 2011, Apple released Xsan 2.2.2, which brought along several reliability fixes.

On July 25, 2012, Apple released Xsan 3, included in OS X Mountain Lion.

On October 17, 2014, Apple released Xsan 4 with OS X Yosemite.

On September 20, 2016, Apple released Xsan 5 with macOS Sierra and macOS Server 5.2.

On November 12, 2020, Apple release Xsan 7 with macOS Big Sur.
