= StorNext File System =

Shared disk file system

StorNext File System (SNFS), colloquially referred to as StorNext is a shared disk file system made by Quantum Corporation. StorNext enables multiple Windows, Linux and Apple workstations to access shared block storage over a Fibre Channel network. With the StorNext file system installed, these computers can read and write to the same storage volume at the same time enabling what is known as a "file-locking SAN." StorNext is used in environments where large files must be shared, and accessed simultaneously by users without network delays, or where a file must be available for access by multiple readers starting at different times. Common use cases include multiple video editor environments in feature film, television and general video post production.

== History ==
The original name of StorNext was CentraVision File System (CVFS). It was created by MountainGate Imaging Systems Corporation to provide fast data transfer between Windows and SGI's IRIX computers. Advanced Digital Information Corporation acquired MountainGate in September 1999, added additional client types, and changed the name to StorNext File System. The first new clients were Solaris and Linux. In August 2006, Quantum acquired ADIC and added StorNext to its product family. In January 2021, Quantum introduced the H-Series, a converged infrastructure that virtually runs file, block, and client services, providing on-premise storage for media production workflows. In April 2022, Quantum released the H4000 Essential, a shared storage and collaboration platform for small, independent creative teams. It combines StorNext 7 software and CatDV asset management for automatic content indexing, discovery, and workflow collaboration.

== Infrastructure ==
StorNext has both software and hardware elements. On the front end, the filesystem is managed by usually two Metadata controllers, a primary and a failover or a metadata appliance. These MDC's act as the traffic director for the block-level filesystem with no data-overhead typically associated with NAS configured network shares.

Fibre Channel connectivity is a key element of most StorNext filesystem implementations. This is often referred to as "Production SAN" or "Production Storage Workspace." In verticals such as oil & gas, InfiniBand connectivity is sometimes used.

Client systems are not required to run the same operating system to access a shared filesystem containing StorNext data. As of January 2008, the operating systems with available client software are Microsoft Windows, macOS (as Xsan developed by Apple), Red Hat Linux, SuSE Linux, HP-UX, Solaris, AIX, and IRIX.

Client systems can be attached either directly to the SAN or via an IP gateway, called a DLC (Distributed LAN Controller). Two or more DLCs can be configured for failover and/or load balancing. While DLC is an IP based protocol, it has been customized for data traffic, making it more efficient (and higher performance) than traditional NAS. In some environments, users have also used the DLC infrastructure to enable lower performance file sharing via NFS or CIFS. Using all three capabilities, customers can create three tiers of front-end client performance: SAN, native DLC, and NAS, all leveraging a common file sharing architecture.

Quantum offers customers two choices for hardware infrastructure for StorNext: customized configurations, using the StorNext software on independently selected hardware; or, the use of the StorNext Appliances and Production Systems, a set of pre-configured solutions from Quantum which are said to be optimized for particular use cases (such as 4K editing). The latter solutions can include embedded technical support.

== Media and entertainment ==
A common application are television and feature film post-production as many multiple editors can access the same set of video data non-destructively.

StorNext has also been leveraged for high end motion and geoscience imagery in both commercial and public sector use cases, and for high density forensic data, such as in cybersecurity.

== Archive integration ==
While colloquially, the StorNext File System is known as 'StorNext', the entire StorNext product is actually the combination of two technologies: the StorNext File System, and the optional StorNext Storage Manager. The StorNext Storage Manager is a policy based data management system that can copy, migrate and/or archive data from the StorNext File System into a variety of storage devices in multiple locations. Data can be tiered into disk, a Quantum Lattus object store, a robotic tape library, or even exported into an offline vault. Regardless of where the data resides, it is all maintained in a single namespace. Customers typically use this capability for three use cases. Some media customers use Storage Manager's policy tiering capability to enable the extension of primary disk storage into object storage or very high performance tape. With the introduction of Lattus-M object storage in 2013, Quantum introduced the capability to archive data durably (at greater than 11 9s) on disk, at very high throughput. Each Lattus-M disk controller can support up to 3 Gbit/s of single streaming performance for video or large files; and these controllers can be scaled horizontally to add performance as required. This has made the combination of StorNext and Lattus-M attractive for use cases such as rapid restore of video or motion imagery, or content distribution. Many customers also use Storage Manager to create granular and efficient data protection (as many versions of policy-selected files can be copied to a second data location or media without the need for a time and resource consuming 'file-walker', avoiding the pain of backup). Finally, administrators use Storage Manager as an HSM for migrating data between tiers (particularly to tape) for cost effective archive. Tapes created by Storage Manager can optionally be written in the LTO industry standard format (LTFS) to enable easy interchange.

== See also ==
- List of file systems
- Xsan
- Metadata controller
- xfs
