= StorageTek SL8500 =

Computer storage

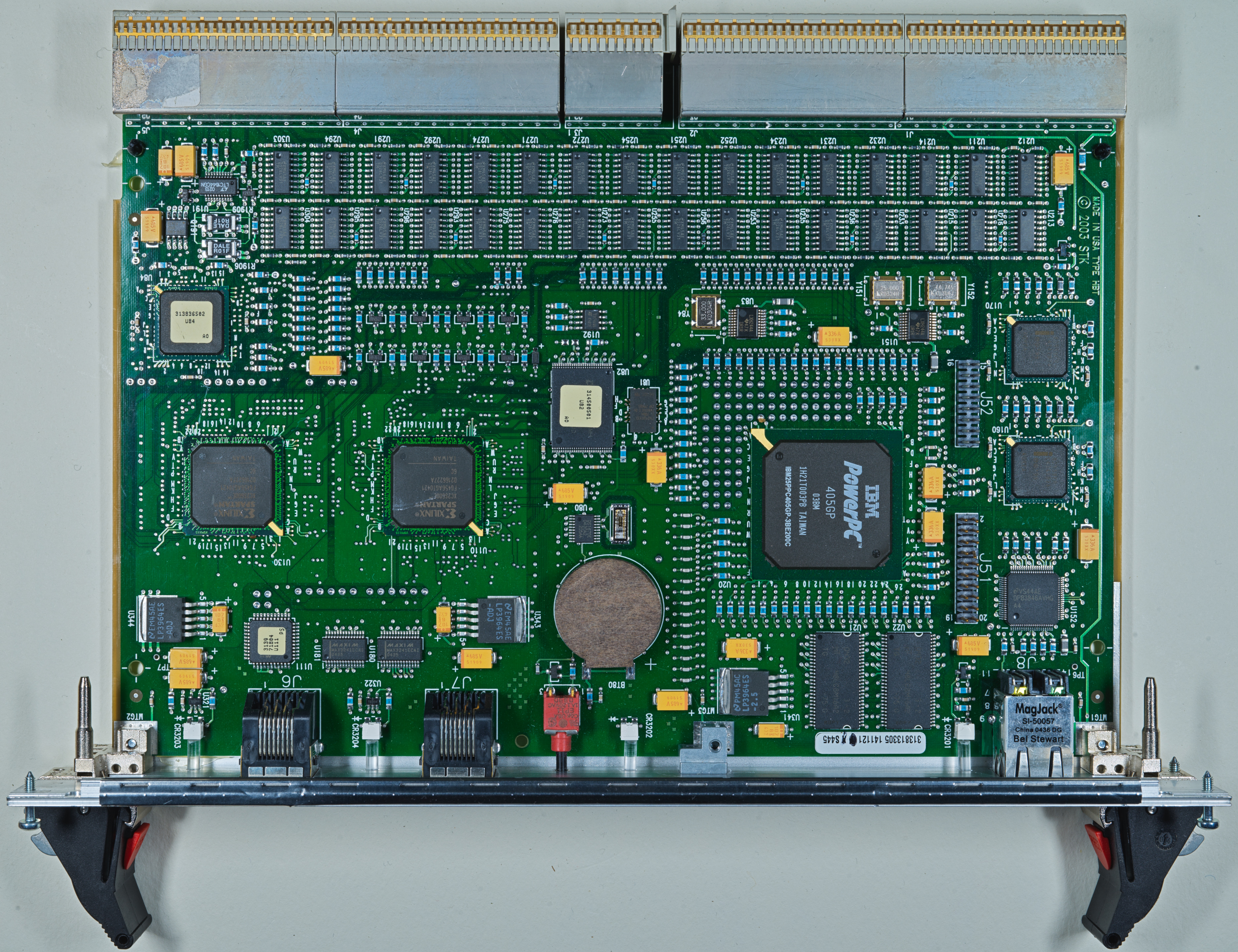
A HBT controller module for StorageTek SL8500. The HBT card translates commands from the HBC controller card into unique drive commands, transferred across differential RS-422 lines. The HBT card contain 66 UARTs; 64 are responsible for the parallel-to-serial conversion for the tape drives and the remaining two communicate with the tape environmental monitor card (HBD card).

StorageTek SL8500 is an enterprise-class robotic tape library, originally marketed by Sun Microsystems and later by Oracle Corporation following their acquisition of Sun in 2010.

Each library module starts with a capacity of 1448 tape cartridges, and expands in 1728 cartridge increments to a maximum capacity of 10088. It supports up to 64 tape drives and 4 or 8 independent robots in each library. Each tape drive installed in the SL8500 library has an independent data path. The aggregate data rate for all drives reaches 58 TB/hour per module using T10000D drives, more with compression.

Up to ten such modules can be connected side-by-side and automatically pass tapes between each other, forming a complex capable of storing over 925 PB of data and mounting 640 tape drives.
