= Linear Tape-Open =

Magnetic tape data storage technology

LTO

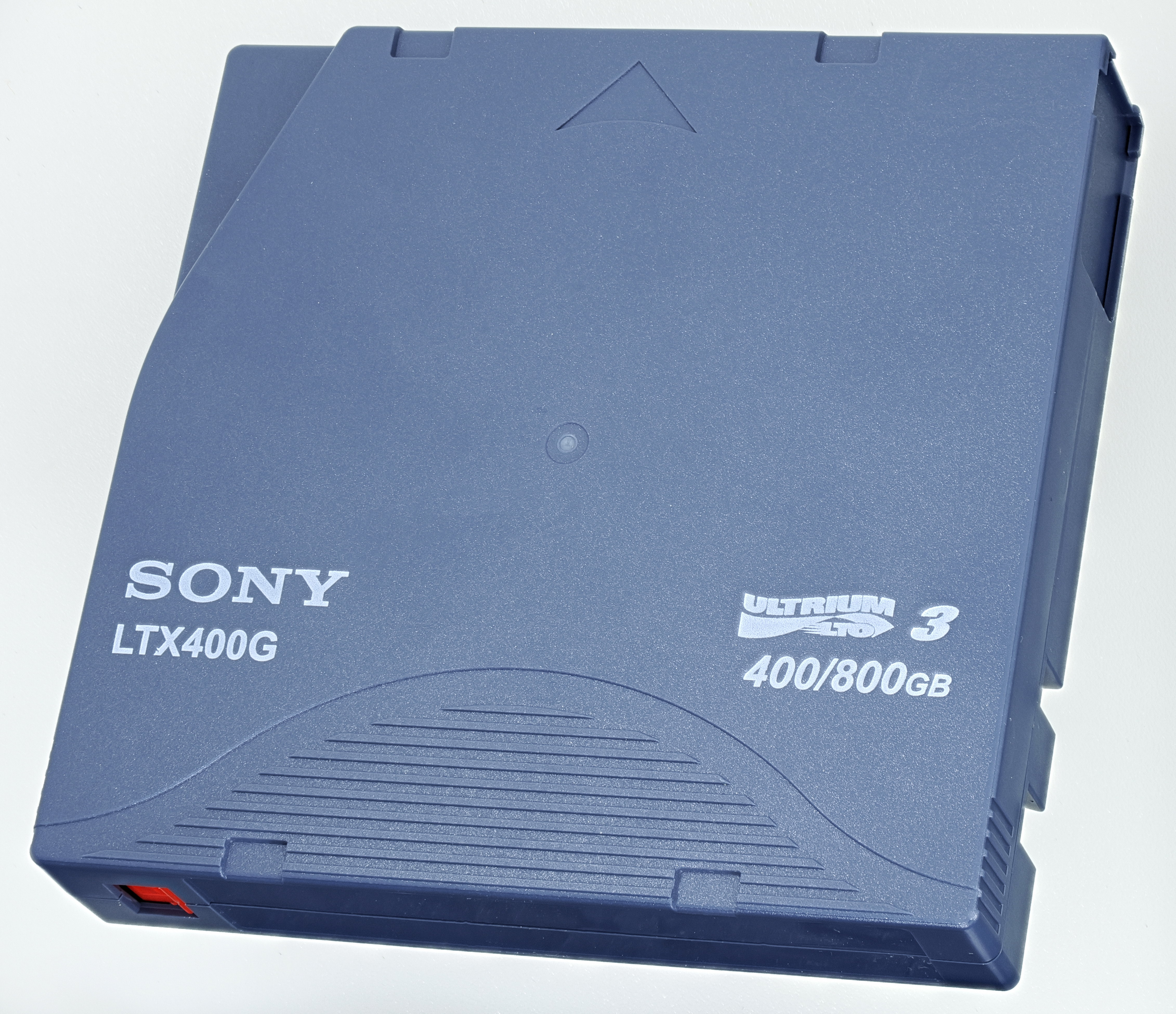
- A 400 GB LTO-3 cartridge by Sony
- Media type: Magnetic tape cartridge
- Capacity: Up to 40 TB
- Developed by: LTO Consortium (HPE, IBM, Quantum)
- Manufactured by: Fujifilm, Sony (tapes); IBM (drives)
- Dimensions: 102.0 × 105.4 × 21.5 mm (4.0 in. x 4.1 in. x 0.8 in.)
- Usage: Archival storage
- Released: 2000; 26 years ago

Linear Tape-Open (LTO), also known as the LTO Ultrium format, is a magnetic tape data storage technology used for backup, data archiving, and data transfer. It was originally developed in the late 1990s as an open-standard alternative to the proprietary magnetic tape formats available at the time. Upon introduction, LTO rapidly defined the super tape market segment and has consistently been the best-selling super-tape format. The latest generation as of 2026, LTO-10, defines two unique cartridge types which can hold 30 TB or 40 TB each.

Cartridges (a.k.a. tapes) contain hundreds of meters of half-inch (12.65 mm) wide tape media wound onto a single reel. The first generation LTO cartridge was released in 2000 and stored 0.1 TB of data. With each new generation, the capacity has increased. All Ultrium cartridges are the same physical size and shape.

Mechanisms (a.k.a. drives, streamers, transports) extract the tape from the cartridge and spool it up on a second reel in the mechanism, reading or writing data as the tape moves between reels. Robotic libraries exist that can hold hundreds or thousands of LTO cartridges and dozens of mechanisms.

Compared to disk or flash storage, LTO offers high-capacity removable cartridges with a lower cost per TB and better long term stability. When considering a complete storage system, LTO requires significantly less electrical power per TB. It also includes built-in technologies useful for data sharing and safe-keeping, like LTFS, WORM, encryption and data compression.

== Historical context ==
Half-inch (12.65 mm) wide magnetic tape has been used for data storage since the 1950s, starting with the open reel formats IBM 7-track and later IBM 9-track.

In the mid-1980s, smaller, enclosed, single-reel cartridge formats were developed by IBM and DEC. Although the physical tape was nominally the same width in these new formats and the preceding open-reel formats, the technologies and intended markets were significantly different and there was no compatibility between them. The IBM 3480 tape format was designed to meet the demanding requirements of its mainframe products. DEC's CompacTape was targeted at a broader market, including minicomputers and smaller systems. Later on, it was renamed Digital Linear Tape (DLT) and eventually sold to Quantum Corporation.

In the late 1980s, Exabyte's Data8 format, derived from Sony's dual-reel cartridge 8 mm video format, saw some popularity, especially with UNIX systems. Sony followed this success with their own now-discontinued 8 mm data format, Advanced Intelligent Tape (AIT).

By the late 1990s, Quantum's DLT and Sony's AIT were the leading options for high-capacity tape storage for PC servers and UNIX systems. These technologies were tightly controlled by their owners and consequently, there was little to no competition between vendors and the prices were relatively high.

=== Birth of LTO ===
Seeing an opportunity, IBM, HP and Seagate formed the LTO Consortium, which introduced a more open format focusing on the same mid-range market segment. Much of the technology is an extension of the work done by IBM at its Tucson lab during the previous 20 years.

In 2000, and around the time of the release of LTO-1, Seagate's magnetic tape division was spun off as Seagate Removable Storage Solutions, renamed Certance in 2003, and subsequently acquired by Quantum in 2004.

==== Unrealized variations ====
Initial plans called for two distinct LTO formats: 1) Ultrium - with half-inch tape on a single reel, optimized for high capacity, and 2) Accelis - with 8 mm tape on dual reels, optimized for fast access. Only Ultrium was ever produced, so in common usage, LTO refers to just the Ultrium form factor.

Additionally, the first generation of Ultrium was proposed to be available with 4 different lengths of tape, holding 10 GB, 30 GB, 50 GB, and 100 GB per cartridge. Only full length cartridges were ever produced.

== Generations ==
Capacities of each LTO generation compared with other tape technologies

As of 2026, ten generations of LTO Ultrium technology have been made available and four more are planned. Between generations, there are strict compatibility rules that describe how and which drives and cartridges can be used together.

The LTO Consortium publishes a roadmap of future generations, which states that LTO-14 will have a capacity of "up to" 913 TB compressed (365 TB native).

=== Key specifications ===
Format	LTO-1	LTO-2	LTO-3	LTO-4	LTO-5	LTO-6	LTO-7	Type M (Note: Type M (label id: M8) is an alternate format of an LTO-7 cartridge, not an independent generation. See: Compatibility)	LTO-8	LTO-9	LTO-10	
Release date	2000	2003	2005	2007	2010	Dec. 2012	Dec. 2015	Dec. 2017		Sep. 2021	May 2025	Jan. 2026
Native capacity (uncompressed) (Note: The units for data capacity and data transfer rates generally follow the "decimal" SI prefix convention (e.g. mega = 10^{6}), not the binary interpretation of a decimal prefix (e.g. mega = 2^{20}).)	100 GB	200 GB	400 GB	800 GB	1.5 TB	2.5 TB	6.0 TB	9 TB	12 TB	18 TB	30 TB	40 TB
Advertised capacity (compressed) (Note: On packaging and in marketing materials, capacities are often stated assuming that data will be compressed at a fixed ratio, commonly 2:1 or 2.5:1.)	200 GB	400 GB	800 GB	1.6 TB	3.0 TB	6.25 TB	15 TB	22.5 TB	30 TB	45 TB	75 TB	100 TB
Max speed MB/s (uncompressed) (Note: This is the maximum data transfer rate between the drive and the tape. See: Data transfer rates)	20	40	80	120	140	160	300		360	400		
Compression capable?	Yes (2:1)					Yes (2.5:1)						
WORM capable?	No		Yes					No	Yes			
Encryption capable?	No			Yes								
LTFS capable?	No				Yes							
Max. number of partitions	1 (no partitioning)				2	4						

=== Compatibility ===
In contrast to other tape technologies, an Ultrium cartridge is rigidly defined by a particular generation of LTO technology and cannot be used in any other way (with the exception of LTO-7 Type M, see below). Ultrium drives prior to LTO-10 have some level of compatibility with older generations of cartridges.

Compatibility					Drives									
Compatibility					LTO-1	LTO-2	LTO-3	LTO-4	LTO-5	LTO-6	LTO-7	LTO-8	LTO-9	LTO-10
Cartridges	LTO-1	0.1 TB	L1	--	RW	RW	R							
Cartridges	LTO-2	0.2 TB	L2	--		RW	RW	R						
Cartridges	LTO-3	0.4 TB	L3	LT			RW	RW	R					
Cartridges	LTO-4	0.8 TB	L4	LU				RW	RW	R				
Cartridges	LTO-5	1.5 TB	L5	LV					RW	RW	R			
Cartridges	LTO-6	2.5 TB	L6	LW						RW	RW			
Cartridges	LTO-7	6 TB	L7	LX							RW	RW		
Cartridges	LTO-7 Type M	9 TB	M8	--								RW		
Cartridges	LTO-8	12 TB	L8	LY								RW	RW	
Cartridges	LTO-9	18 TB	L9	LZ									RW	
Cartridges	LTO-10	30 TB	LA	LH										RW
Cartridges	LTO-10	40 TB	PA											RW
	Generation	Capacity	Regular; ID	WORM; ID	RW Read & Write compatible R Read Only compatible									

The rules for compatibility between generations of drives and cartridges are as follows:

- Drives of every generation can read and write cartridges of the same generation.
- Drives from generations 2 through 9 can also read and write cartridges of the prior generation.
- Drives from generations 3 through 7 can also read (but not write) cartridges of 2 generations prior.
- Drives from generation 8 can reformat unused cartridges from generation 7 with a special, higher-capacity format (Type M (M8)). Once reformatted as Type M, the cartridge is only compatible with drives from generation 8.

Within the compatibility rules stated above, drives and cartridges from different vendors are expected to be interchangeable. For example, a tape written on any one vendor's drive should be fully readable on any other vendor's drive that is compatible with that generation of LTO.

== Core technology ==
=== Tape specifications ===
Generations	LTO-1	LTO-2	LTO-3	LTO-4	LTO-5	LTO-6	LTO-7	LTO-7 Type M (M8)	LTO-8	LTO-9	LTO-10	
Native capacity	100 GB	200 GB	400 GB	800 GB	1.5 TB	2.5 TB	6.0 TB	9.0 TB	12 TB	18 TB	30 TB	40 TB
Tape length	609 m		680 m	820 m	846 m		960 m			1035 m		1337 m
Tape width	12.650 mm ± 0.006 mm											
Tape thickness	8.9 μm		8 μm	6.6 μm	6.4 μm	6.4 μm or 6.1 μm (BaFe)	5.6 μm			5.2 μm		4.0 μm
Magnetic pigment material	Metal particulate (MP)					MP or BaFe	BaFe				SrFe & BaFe hybrid	
Base material	Polyethylene naphthalate (PEN)											Aramid
Data bands per tape	4											
Wraps per band	12	16	11	14	20	34	28	42	52	70	118	
Tracks per wrap, read/write elements	8		16				32					
Total tracks	384	512	704	896	1,280	2,176	3,584	5,376	6,656	8,960	15,104	
Linear density (bits/mm)	4,880	7,398	9,638	13,250	15,142	15,143	19,094	19,104	20,668	21,459		
Time to write a full tape at max speed (hh:mm)	1:23			1:51	3:10	4:20	5:33	8:20	9:16	12:30	20:50	?
Encoding	RLL 1,7	RLL 0,13/11; PRML			RLL 32/33; PRML	RLL 32/33; NPML				?	?	?
End-to-end passes required to fill tape	48	64	44	56	80	136	112	168	208	280	472	
Expected tape durability, end-to-end passes	9,600	16,000	16,000	11,200	16,000	20,000				?	?	?

=== Band layout ===
Four data bands and five servo bands, to scale.

LTO Ultrium tape is laid out with four wide data bands sandwiched between five narrow servo bands. A thin edge guard band runs along each edge. The tape head assembly, which reads from and writes to the tape, straddles a single data band and the two adjacent servo bands. The head assembly has two servo read heads, separated by multiple (8, 16, or 32) data read and write heads, evenly spaced across the data band.

=== Servo bands ===
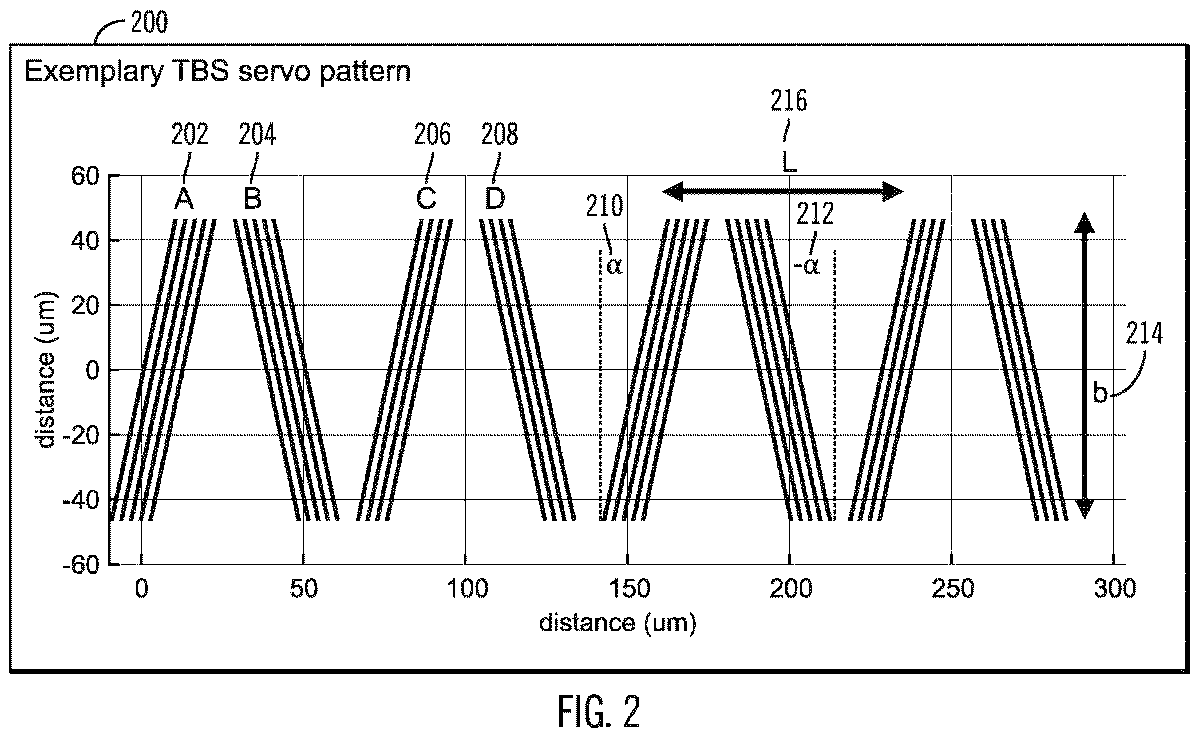
An example of the Time-Based Servo (TBS) pattern written entirely within each Servo Band

The servo bands contain a pattern of angled magnetic stripes permanently written to the tape at the factory. The primary use of the servo signal is to maintain the transverse position of the tape head in relation to the tape. This allows the tape head to precisely follow each track as the tape moves past at high speed.

The servo signal can also encode a low bitrate data stream. This data is used to encode the longitudinal position (LPOS) of that point on the tape. In addition to LPOS, manufacturers can encode additional data in the signal. With LPOS and a precise time source, a tape drive can precisely measure the velocity of the tape.

The incompatibility between LTO-10 and earlier generations is due to two changes to the servo positioning system. First, the angle of the magnetic stripes was changed from 6° in all previous generations to 36° for better head-positioning accuracy. Second, the head assembly is tilted, allowing it to follow each servo band independently (adjusting the tilt angle to follow any change in the servo band spacing), thereby correcting for any variation in tape width due to temperature, humidity, tension, etc.

=== Data bands ===
The actual data stored on the tape is recorded in individual tracks located within the data bands. Depending on the generation, there could be from 96 to almost 4000 data tracks per band.

The tape head has 8, 16, or 32 data read/write head elements and additional servo read elements. The heads read or write tracks in parallel, each within its own data sub-band. The set of 8, 16, or 32 tracks written in a single, one-way, end-to-end pass is called a "wrap". The tape head shifts laterally to access the different wraps within each band, and also to access the other bands.

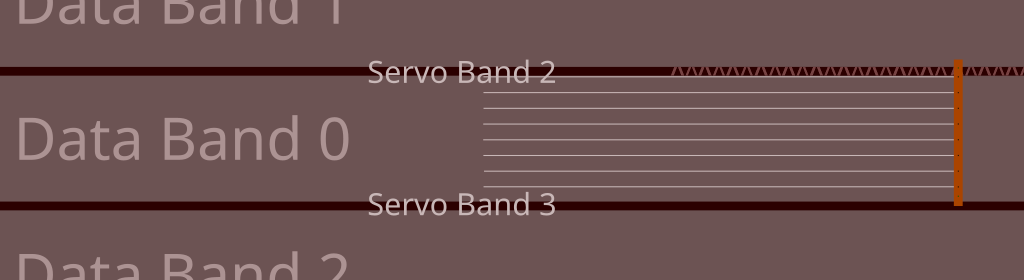
Band 0, Wrap 0 being written to an LTO1 tape. Top servo head is reading the pattern in Servo Band 2.

Writing to a blank tape starts at band 0, wrap 0, a forward wrap that runs from the beginning of the tape (BOT) to the end of the tape (EOT) and includes a track that runs along one side of the data band. The next wrap written, band 0, wrap 1, is a reverse wrap (EOT to BOT) and includes a track along the other side of the band. Wraps continue in forward and reverse passes, with slight shifts toward the middle of the band on each pass.

Because each data head only needs to be positioned within one half (upper or lower, depending on tape direction) of its data sub-band, and there are at least 8 heads, the servo bands only need to be slightly more than 1/16 the width of the data bands.

The tracks written on each pass partially overlap the tracks written on the previous wrap of the same direction, an example of shingled magnetic recording. The back and forth pattern, working from the edges into the middle, conceptually resembles a coiled serpent and is known as linear serpentine recording.

Each half of each data sub-band is read or written in a single direction. This offers two advantages. First, it provides more consistent head positioning, allowing the tolerance on track pitch (the distance between adjacent written tracks) to be tighter. Second, it allows the servo bands to be narrower, as they only need to position each head within half of its data sub-band. There is a small gap between the halves of a data sub-band, so that the last wrap written does not obliterate the nearby second-last wrap.

=== Encoding ===
At the physical level of any magnetic storage medium, each track is a sequence of analog magnetic flux reversals encoding a binary digital signal. Reliably converting between the digital and analog domains can be challenging. To make this work, Run-length limited (RLL), Partial-response maximum-likelihood (PRML), and Noise-predictive maximum-likelihood detection (NPML) encoding techniques have been developed.

=== Logical structure ===
The block structure of the tape is logical, so interblock gaps, file marks, tape marks and so forth take only a few bytes each. In LTO-1 and LTO-2, this logical structure has CRC codes and compression added to create blocks of 403,884 bytes. Another chunk of 468 bytes of information (including statistics and information about the drive that wrote the data and when it was written) is then added to create a "dataset". Finally error correction bytes are added to bring the total size of the dataset to 491,520 bytes (480 KiB) before it is written in a specific format across the eight heads. LTO-3 and LTO-4 use a similar format with 1,616,940-byte blocks.

The tape drives use a strong error correction algorithm that makes data recovery possible when lost data is within one track. Also, the head assembly includes separate read heads positioned just "behind" each write head, to verify the data just written without making a separate verification pass. This allows the drive to write a second copy of any data that fails the verify without the help of the host system.

=== Durability ===
LTO tape is designed for 15 to 30 years of archival storage. If tapes are archived for longer than 6 months they must be stored at a temperature between 16 and 25 °C (61 and 77 °F) and between 20–50% RH. Both drives and media should be kept free from airborne dust or other contaminants from packing and storage materials, paper dust, cardboard particles, printer toner dust etc.

Depending on the generation of LTO technology, a single LTO tape should be able to sustain approximately 200–364 full file passes. There is a large amount of lifespan variability in actual use. One full file pass is equal to writing enough data to fill an entire tape and takes between 44 and 208 end-to-end passes. Regularly writing only 50% capacity of the tape results in half as many end-to-end tape passes for each scheduled backup, and thereby doubles the tape lifespan. LTO uses an automatic verify-after-write technology to immediately check the data as it is being written, but some backup systems explicitly perform a completely separate tape reading operation to verify the tape was written correctly. This separate verify operation doubles the number of end-to-end passes for each scheduled backup, and reduces the tape life by half.

== Optional technology ==
The original release of LTO technology defined an optional data compression feature. Subsequent generations of LTO have introduced new technologies, including WORM, encryption, and partitioning features. These features are built into the drives and/or tapes and can be ignored or enabled. Compression and encryption can also be performed in software prior to the data being sent to the tape drive. However, the partitioning function can only be done in hardware, and the WORM feature requires special WORM tapes.

=== Compression ===
The original LTO specification describes a data compression method LTO-DC, also called Streaming Lossless Data Compression (SLDC). It is very similar to the algorithm ALDC which is a variation of LZS. LTO-1 through LTO-5 are advertised as achieving a "2:1" compression ratio, while LTO-6 and later generations, which apply a modified SLDC algorithm using a larger history buffer, are advertised as having a "2.5:1" ratio. This is inferior to slower algorithms such as gzip, but similar to lzop and the high speed algorithms built into other tape drives. The actually achievable ratio generally depends on the compressibility of the data, e.g. for precompressed data such as ZIP files, JPEG images, and MPEG video or audio the ratio will be close to or equal to 1:1.

=== WORM ===
New for LTO-3 was write once read many (WORM) capability. This is useful for legal record keeping, and for protection from accidental or intentional erasure, for example from ransomware, or simply human error. Standard LTO cartridges do include a write-protect switch in the bottom-left corner, although it is easily overridden by the user and does not provide any protection from accidental deletion by, for example, misidentification of a cartridge. An LTO-3 or later drive will not erase or overwrite data on a WORM cartridge, but will read it. A WORM cartridge is identical to a normal tape cartridge of the same generation with the following exceptions: the cartridge memory identifies it to the drive as WORM, the servo tracks are slightly different to allow verification that data has not been modified, the bottom half of the cartridge shell is gray, and it may come with tamper-proof screws. WORM-capable drives immediately recognize WORM cartridges and include a unique WORM ID with every dataset written to the tape. There is nothing different about the tape medium in a WORM cartridge.

Saving business records to WORM tapes can help organizations comply with regulations like 17 CFR 240.17a-4.

=== Encryption ===
The LTO-4 specification added a feature to allow LTO-4 drives to encrypt data before it is written to tape. All LTO-4 drives must be aware of encrypted tapes, but are not required to support the encryption process. All current LTO manufacturers support encryption natively enabled in the tape drives using Application Managed Encryption (AME). The algorithm used by LTO-4 is AES-GCM, which is an authenticated, symmetric block cipher. The same key is used to encrypt and decrypt data, and the algorithm can detect tampering with the data. Tape drives, tape libraries, and backup software can request and exchange encryption keys using either proprietary protocols, or an open standard like OASIS's Key Management Interoperability Protocol.

=== Partitioning ===
The LTO-5 specification introduced the partitioning feature that allows a tape to be divided into two separately writable areas, known as partitions. LTO-6 extends the specification to allow 4 separate partitions. Partitions can be sized as any multiple of 2 full wraps and must be separated by 2 empty guard wraps, unless the partitions align with the data band boundaries.

==== LTFS ====
The Linear Tape File System (LTFS) is an open standard for a self-describing tape format and file system made possible by the partition feature. File data and filesystem metadata are stored in separate partitions on the tape. By default, LTFS uses the first 2 wraps for an Index partition storing the metadata, leaves 2 empty guard wraps, and uses the remaining wraps for the Data partition holding the data files.

The key benefit of LTFS is to make a tape usable as if it were a removable disk, albeit with very high latency. Since LTFS is an open standard, with multiple implementations available for multiple operating systems, it enables easy data interchange. Additionally, using an open standard reduces the risk of archival data being inaccessible in the future.

== Cartridges ==
As of 2025, 10 generations of data cartridges and 1 type of universal cleaning cartridge have been produced by 6 manufacturers. All LTO Ultrium cartridges are the same size and shape. Humans and robotic libraries can identify the cartridges by barcode labels. Tape drives can identify cartridges by the internal cartridge memory.

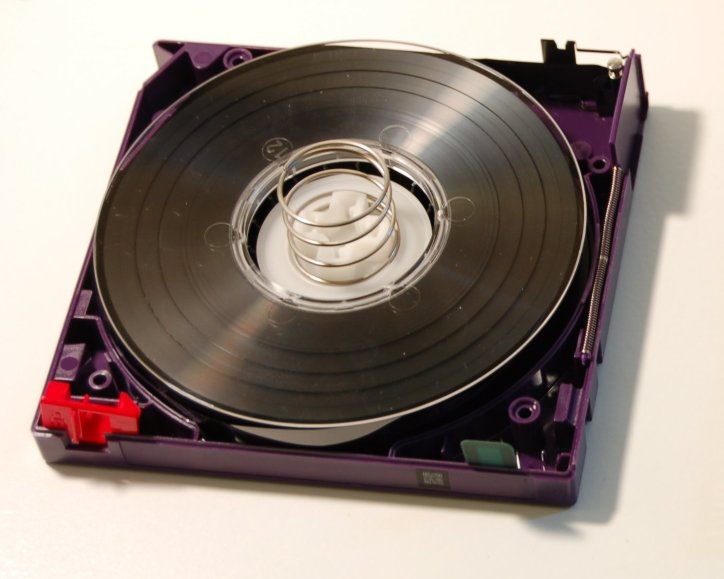
LTO-2 cartridge with the top shell removed, showing the internal components. Top right corner: tape access gate. Bottom left corner: write-protect-tab. Bottom right corner: cartridge memory chip

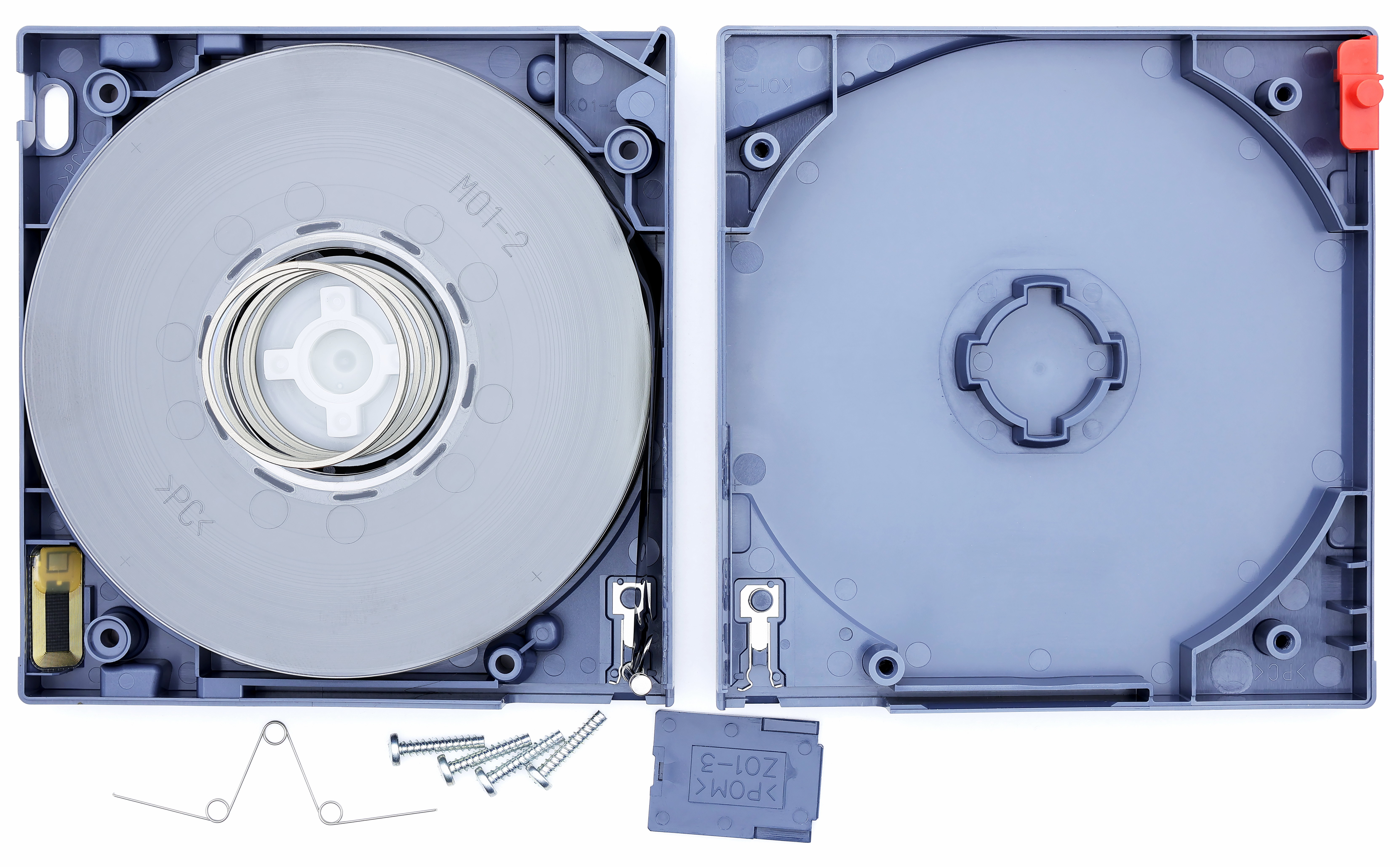
LTO-3 cartridge with the top shell removed, showing the internal components. Top right corner: write-protect-tab. Bottom left corner: cartridge memory chip. Bottom: tape access gate.

=== Manufacturers ===
Throughout the history of the format, there have been six compliance-verified, licensed manufacturers of LTO technology media: EMTEC, Imation, Fujifilm, Maxell, TDK, and Sony. All other brands of media are (or were) manufactured by these companies under contract. Verbatim and Quantegy both licensed LTO technology, but never manufactured their own compliance-verified media. Since its bankruptcy in 2003, EMTEC no longer manufactures LTO media products. Imation ended all magnetic tape production in 2011, but continued making cartridges using TDK tape for a while. Maxell produced cartridges up to and including generation 6 in 2012, but has since withdrawn from the market. TDK withdrew from the data tape business in 2014.

As of 2019, only Fujifilm and Sony continue to manufacture LTO cartridges.

=== Cartridge specifications ===
Cartridges of all generations have the same dimensions, 102.0 mm × 105.4 mm × 21.5 mm (4.02 in × 4.15 in × 0.85 in).

LTO cartridge specifications
		UCC	LTO-1	LTO-2	LTO-3	LTO-4	LTO-5	LTO-6	LTO-7	Type M	LTO-8	LTO-9	LTO-10
Colors	Typical Regular	Black	Black	Purple	Blue-gray	Green (dark)	Dark red	Black	Purple		Dark red	Green (dark)	Black
Colors	HP Regular	Orange	Blue	Dark red	Yellow	Green	Light blue	Purple	Slate blue		Green	Light blue	Purple
Colors	Typical WORM	--								--			
Colors	HP WORM	--								--			
Labels	Regular ID	*	L1	L2	L3	L4	L5	L6	L7	M8	L8	L9	LA; PA
Labels	WORM ID	--	--	--	LT	LU	LV	LW	LX	--	LY	LZ	LH
Labels	Notes	Cleaning Cartridges are identified by having "C L N" as the first 3 characters of the barcode. Some also use the ID "CU".; Diagnostic Cartridges are identified by having "D G space" as the first 3 characters of the barcode.											
Memory	CM Blocks	128				255		511				1023	
Memory	CM Capacity	4 KiB				8 KiB		16 KiB				32 KiB	
Memory	CM Block size	Each Cartridge Memory (CM) block is 32 Bytes											

=== Colors ===
The colors of LTO Ultrium cartridge shells are mostly consistent. HP is the notable exception. Sometimes similar, rather than identical, color names are used by different manufacturers (slate-blue and blue-gray; green, teal, and blue-green; dark red and burgundy).

WORM (write once, read many) cartridges are two-tone: the top half of the shell is the normal color of that generation for that manufacturer, and the bottom half of the shell is a light gray.

=== Memory ===
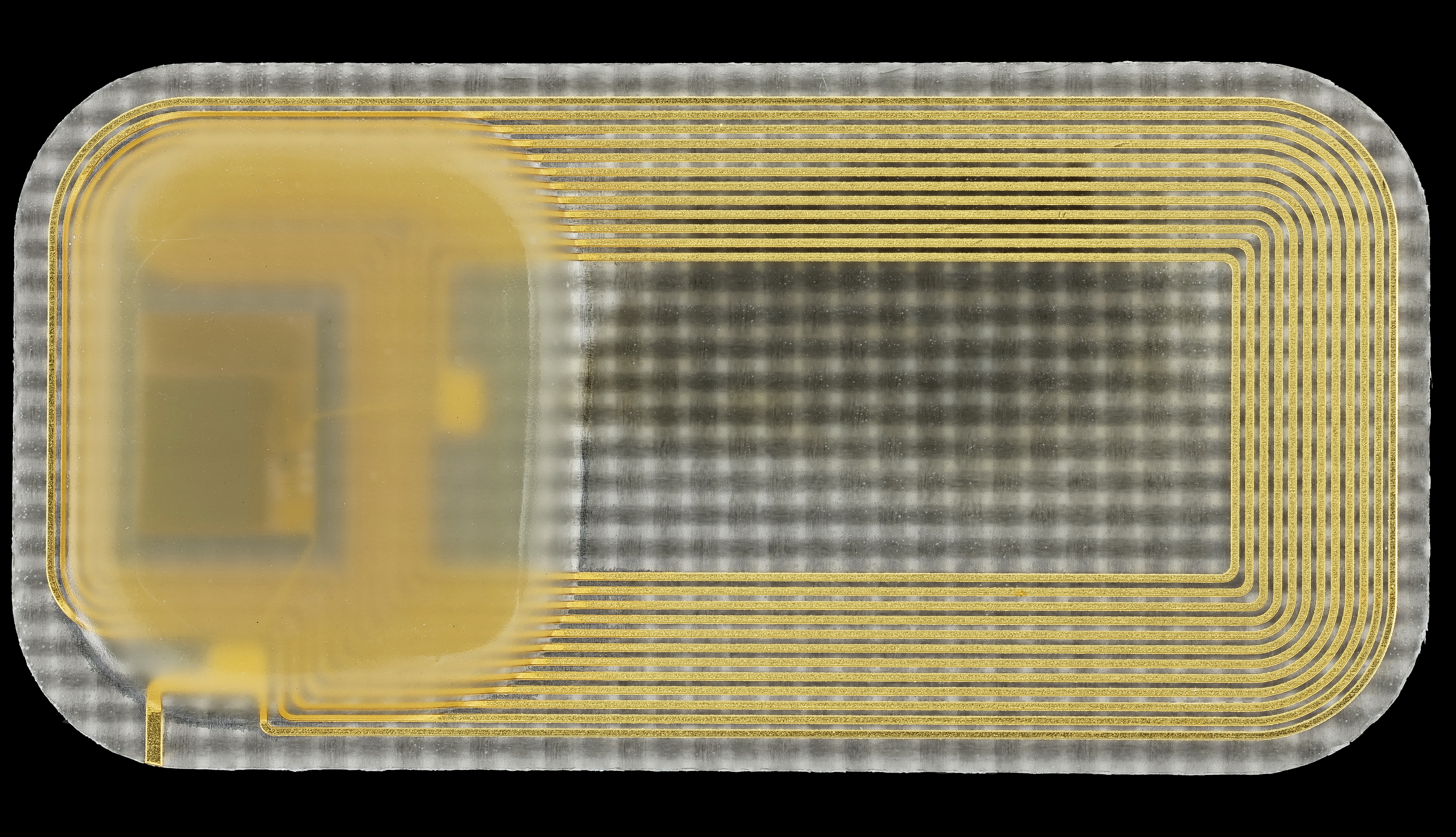
LTO cartridge memory

Every LTO cartridge has a cartridge memory (CM) chip inside it, which is used to identify tapes, to discriminate between different LTO generations, and to store tape-use information. This memory can be read or written, one 32-byte block at a time, via a non-contacting passive 13.56 MHz RF interface. The non-contact interface has a range of 20 mm.

Every LTO drive has a cartridge memory reader in it. External readers are available, both built into tape libraries and PC based. One such reader, Veritape, connects by USB to a PC and integrates with analytical software to evaluate the quality of tapes. This device is also rebranded as the Spectra MLM Reader and the Maxell LTO Cartridge Memory Analyzer. Proxmark3 and other generic RFID readers are also able to read data.

=== Labels ===
An example of an LTO-6 label

The LTO cartridge label in tape library applications commonly uses the bar code symbology of USS-39. A description and definition is available from the Automatic Identification Manufacturers (AIM) specification Uniform Symbol Specification (USS-39) and the ANSI MH10.8M-1993 Barcode specification. For LTO labels, there are 6 characters plus an ID code. This identifier is called a VOLSER, for Volume Serial.

=== Leader pin ===
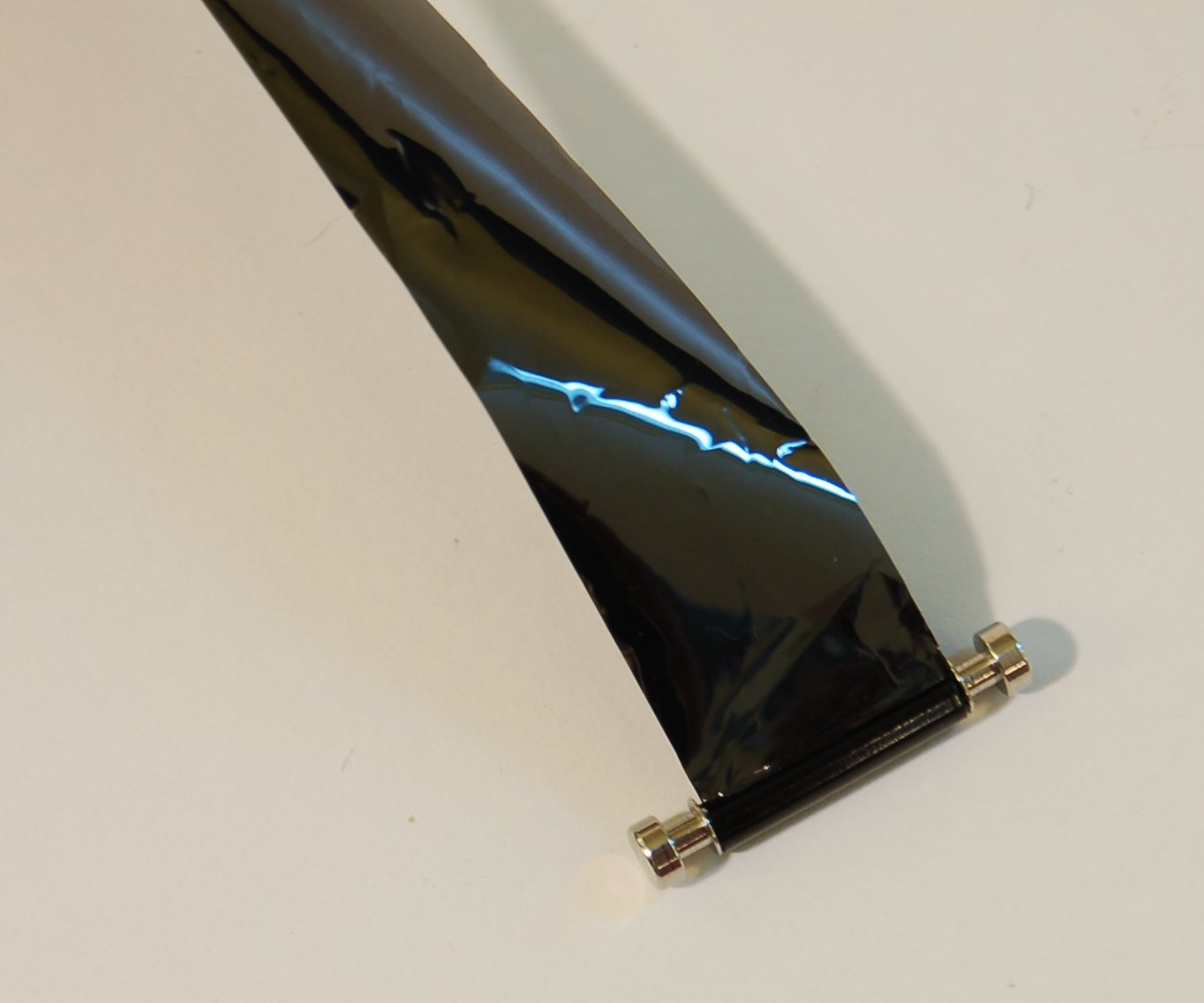
Leader pin on the end of a length of LTO tape

The tape inside an LTO cartridge is wound around a single reel. The end of the tape is attached to a perpendicular leader pin that is used by an LTO drive to reliably grasp the end of the tape and mount it in a take-up reel inside the drive. Older single-reel tape technologies, such as 9-track tape and DLT, used different means to load tape onto a take-up reel. When a cartridge is not in a drive, the pin is held in place at the opening of the cartridge with a small spring. A common reason for a cartridge failing to load into a drive is the misplacement of the leader pin as a result of the cartridge having been dropped. The plastic slot where the pin is normally held is deformed by the drop and the leader pin is no longer in the position that the drive expects it to be.

=== Erasing ===
The magnetic servo tracks on the tape are factory encoded. Using a bulk eraser, degaussing, or otherwise exposing the cartridge to a strong magnetic field, will erase the servo tracks along with the data tracks, rendering the cartridge unusable. Erasing the data tracks without destroying the servo tracks can be done with an LTO drive or with special equipment. The erasing head used in these erasers has four magnetic poles that match the width and the location of the data bands. The gaps between the poles correspond to the servo tracks, which are not erased. Tapes erased by this equipment can be recorded again.

=== Cleaning ===
A Universal Cleaning Cartridge can be used to remove debris from the tape read and write heads in a tape drive. Although keeping a tape drive clean is important, normal cleaning cartridges are abrasive and frequent use will shorten the drive's lifespan. Cleaning cartridge lifespan is usually from 15 to 50 cleanings.

In addition to keeping the tape drive clean, it is also important to keep the media clean. Debris on the media can be deposited onto drive components that are in contact with the tape. This debris can result in increased media wear which generates more debris. Removing excessive debris from tape can reduce the number of data errors. Cleaning of the media requires special equipment. These cleaners are also used by Spectra Logic to clean new media that is marketed as "CarbideClean" media.

== Mechanisms ==
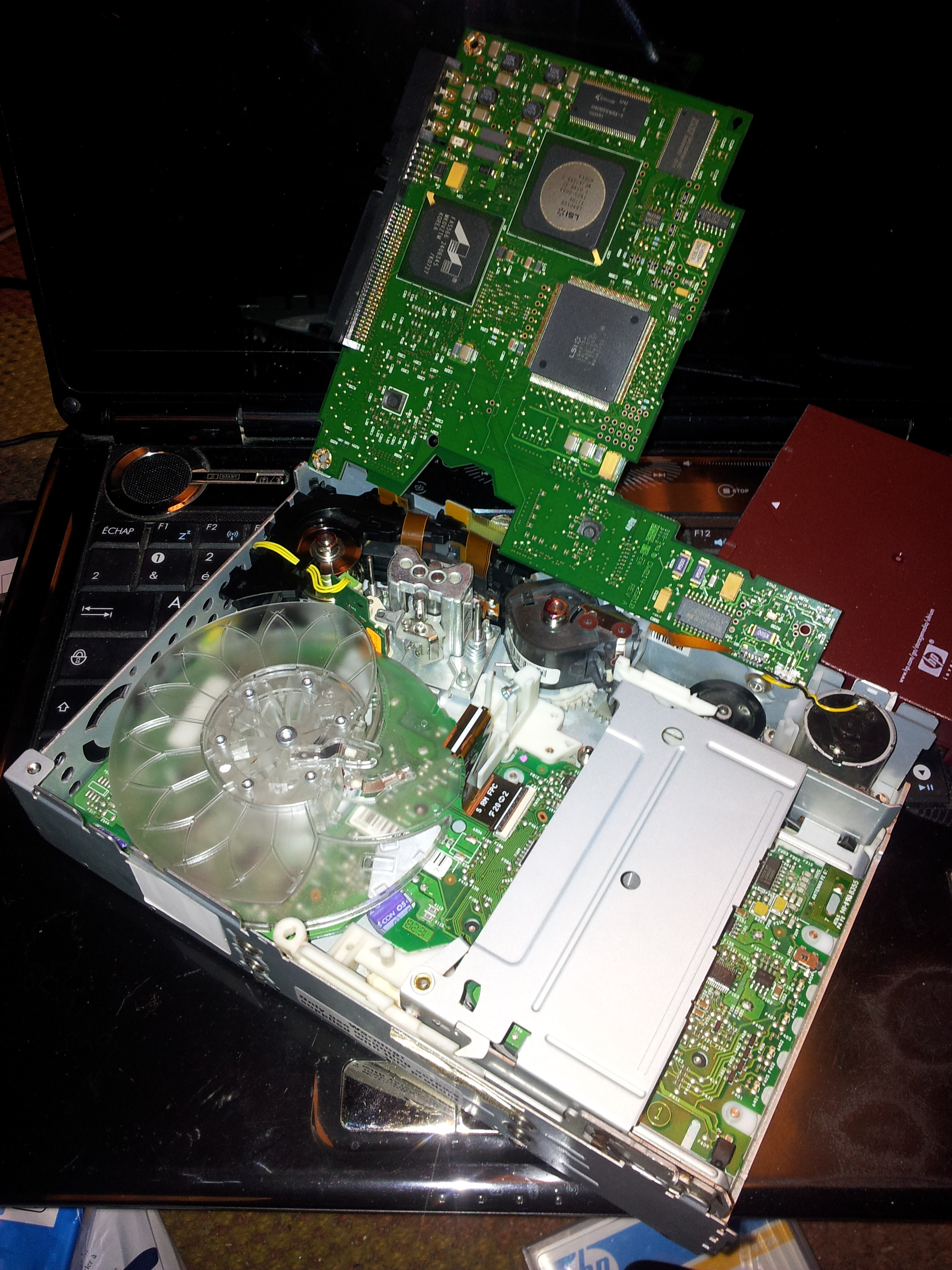
Inside a LTO-2 tape drive

As of 2019, compliance-verified licensed manufacturers of current LTO technology mechanisms are IBM, Hewlett-Packard, and Quantum, although both Hewlett Packard and Quantum have stopped new development of drive mechanisms. The mechanisms, also known as tape drives or streamers, are available in Full-height and Half-height form factors.

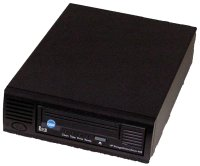
HP Half-Height LTO-2 drive in an enclosure for desktop use

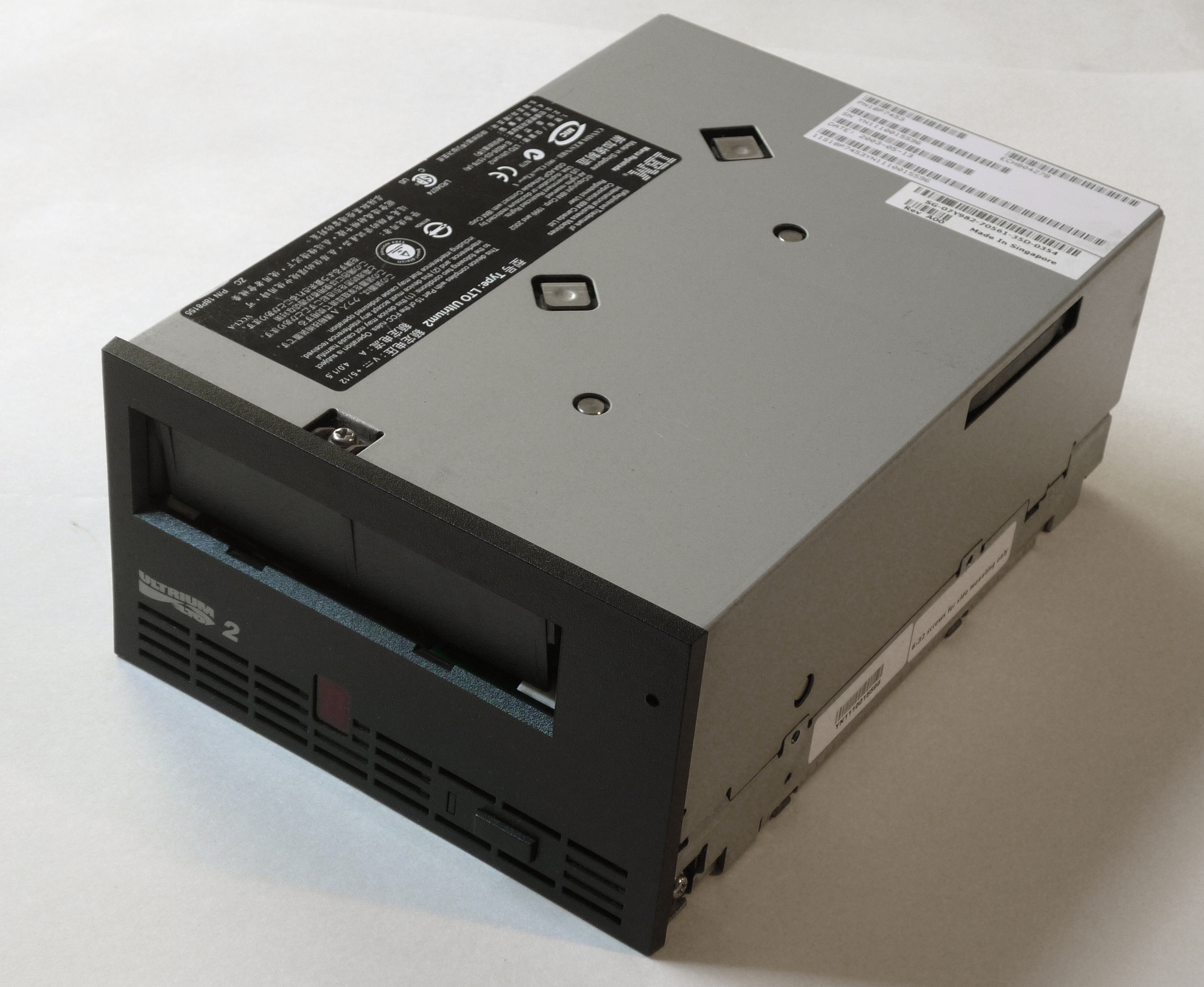
An LTO-2 mechanism, from IBM. This SCSI drive fits in a 5.25 inch, Full-Height drive bay.

=== Data transfer rates ===
Max I/O speeds of LTO and other technologies

Minimum and maximum data transfer rates vary by generation and by drive. Half height drives may not attain the same speeds as full-height drives of the same generation.

If data compression (or decompression) is being performed, the average speed between the drive and the computer would be higher than the speed between tape and the drive.

Drives usually support variable-speed operation to dynamically match the data rate flow. This nearly eliminates tape backhitching or "shoe-shining", maximizing overall throughput and device/tape life.

=== Positioning times ===
Specifications vary between different drives. Some drives can position or rewind the tape at 10 m/s. A typical LTO-7 drive will take about 15 seconds to load the tape and 20 seconds to unload the tape. These drives have an average rewind time of 60 seconds and an average access time (from beginning of tape) of about 56 seconds. Because of serpentine writing methods, rewinding often takes less time than the maximum. If a tape is written to full capacity, there is no rewind time, since the last pass is a reverse pass leaving the head at the beginning of the tape (the number of wraps is always an even number).

=== Cleaning ===
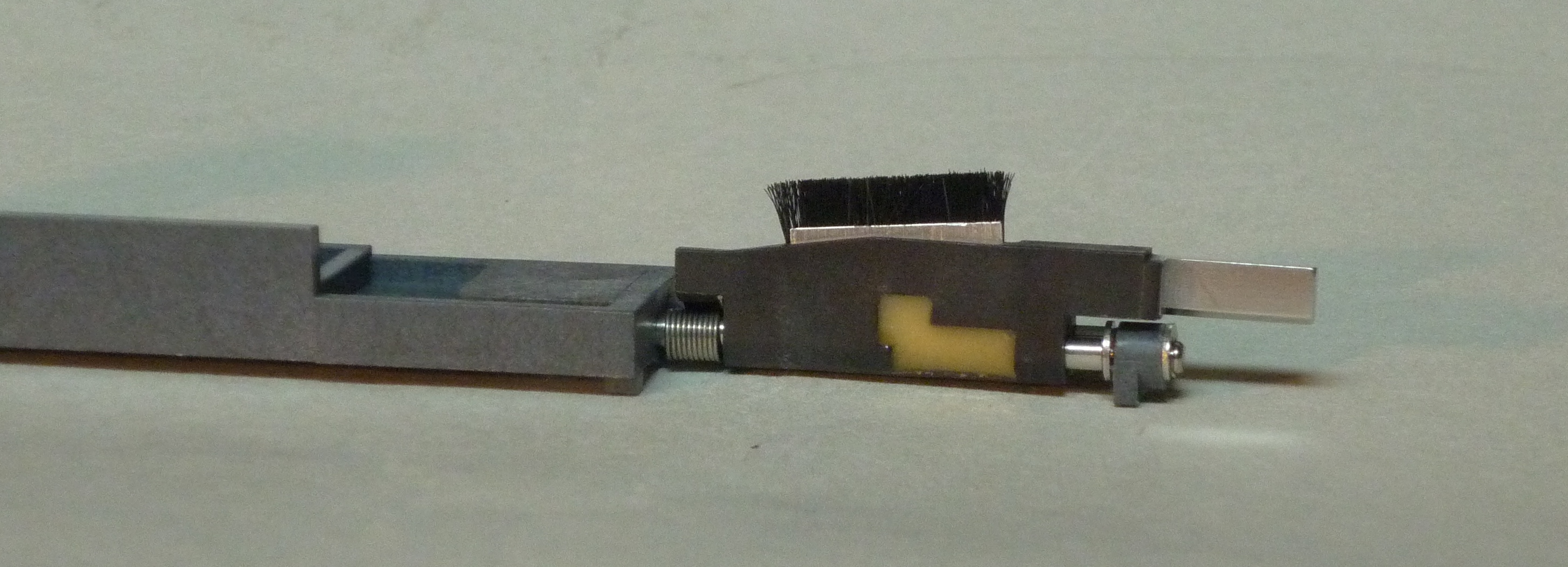
Internal head cleaning brush from an IBM LTO-2 FH drive. Swipes once for every insert and eject

LTO drives have an internal tape head cleaning brush that is activated when a cartridge is inserted.

When a more thorough cleaning is required, the drive signals this on its display and/or via Tape Alert flags. A cleaning cartridge can be inserted and the mechanism will automatically initiate a cleaning operation, passing a portion of the cleaning tape over the tape head to dislodge and collect any accumulated debris.

=== Libraries ===
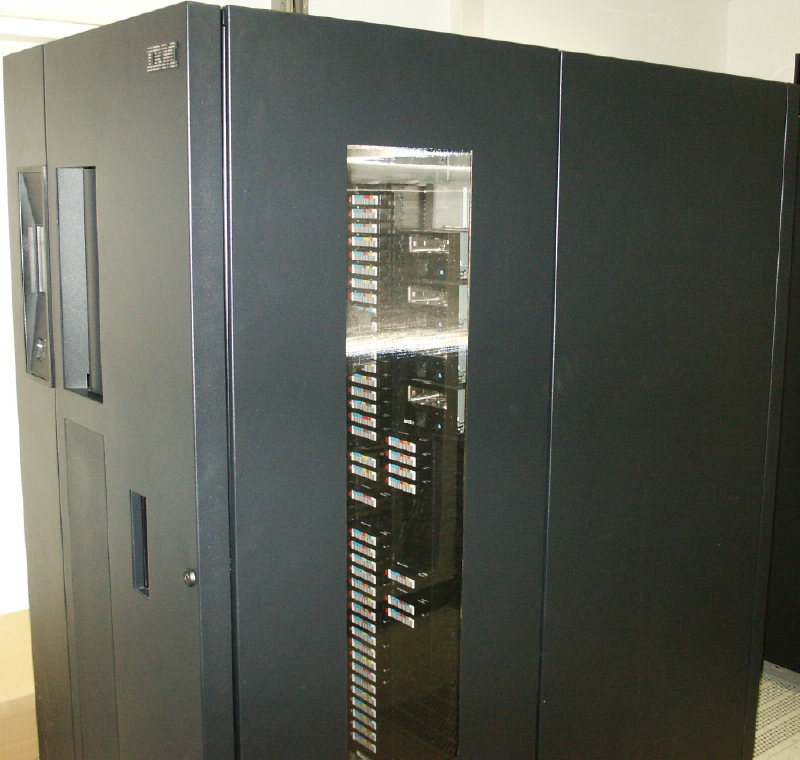
IBM 3584 tape library with LTO-1 (Ultrium) tapes visible

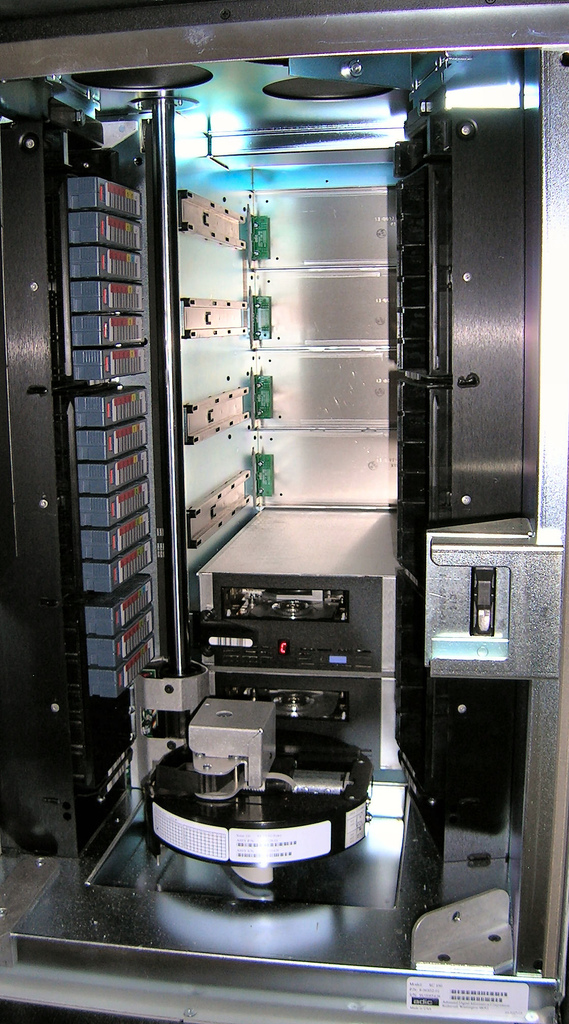
ADIC Scalar 100 tape library interior

These drives are frequently packaged into external desktop enclosures or carriers that fit into a robotic tape library.

As of 2025, large automated tape libraries are available from IBM, Spectra Logic, Oracle StorageTek, and Quantum (formerly ADIC). Smaller libraries and autochangers are available from other vendors too, including many rebranded units originally manufactured by BDT. Currently available libraries can hold up to two thousand LTO cartridges in the volume of a typical data center rack. Total storage per unit can exceed tens of Petabytes with I/O rates exceeding hundreds of Terabytes per day.

== Sales and market ==
Tape technology releases since 2010, with native storage capacity
2010	LTO-5 - 1.5 TB
2011	TS1140 - 4 TB
2011	T10000C - 5 TB
2012	LTO-6 - 2.5 TB
2013	T10000D - 8.5 TB
2014	TS1150 - 10 TB
2015	LTO-7 - 6 TB
2016
2017	LTO-8 - 12 TB
2018	TS1160 - 20 TB
2019
2020
2021	LTO-9 - 18 TB
2022
2023	TS1170 - 50 TB
2024
2025	LTO-10 - 30 TB
2026	LTO-10 - 40 TB

In the course of its existence, LTO has succeeded in completely displacing all other low-end/mid-range tape technologies such as AIT, DLT, DAT/DDS, and VXA. And after the exit of Oracle StorageTek T10000 of the high-end market, only the IBM 3592 series and LTO are still under active development. LTO also competes against hard disk drives (HDDs) in some use cases, and its continuous improvement has prevented the predicted "death of tape".

=== LTO Sales ===
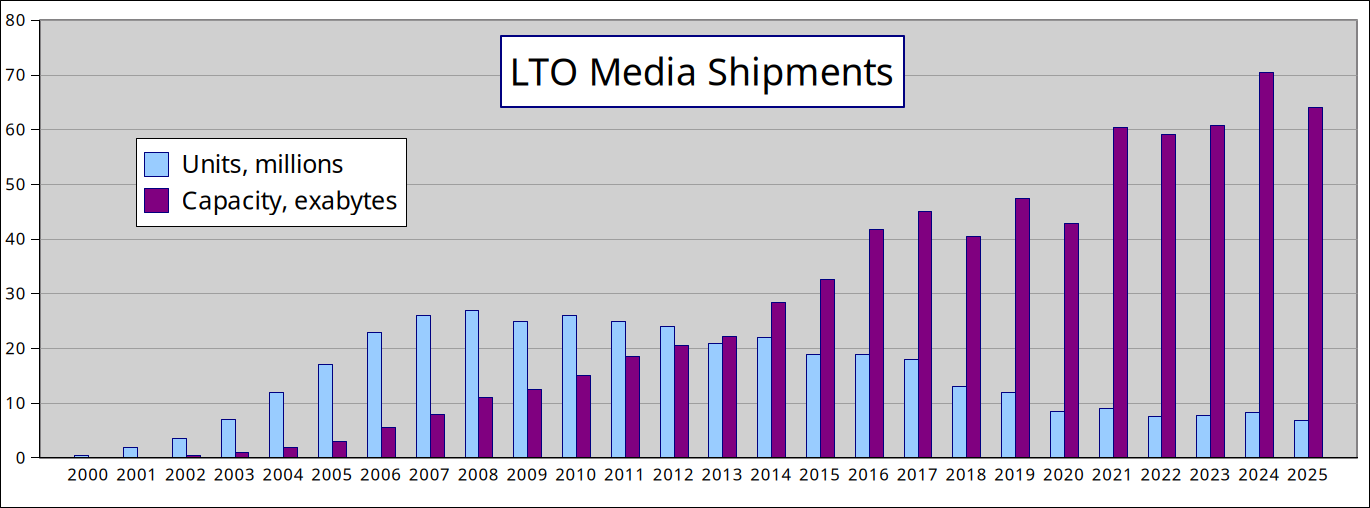
LTO media shipments, 2000–2025

Since its inception, over 5 Million LTO drives and 500 EB of media capacity have been sold.

The presence of five certified media manufacturers and four certified mechanism manufacturers for a while produced a competitive market for LTO products. However, as of 2019, there are only two manufacturers developing media, Sony and Fuji, and only IBM is developing mechanisms.

The LTO organization publishes annual media shipments measured in both units and compressed capacity. Media unit shipments peaked in 2008, at about 28 million. However, the 176 Exabytes of total compressed storage capacity shipped in 2024 is the highest ever reported.

Public information on tape drive sales is not readily available. Units shipped annually peaked at about 800,000 in 2008, but have declined since then to about 400,000 units in 2010, and to less than 250,000 by the end of 2018

=== 2025 - present ===
Since late 2025, demand for computer components including tape has soared, largely due to the AI boom with LTO sales and prices increasing.

=== Comparison to disk storage ===
For decades, tape storage has primarily been used only in a few special situations, such as with mainframes or for backup and archiving, so the declining cost of disk made it seem possible that disk would completely take over the remaining uses of tape. In spite of this, the continuing evolution of tape technology, and particularly LTO, has kept tape storage relevant.

=== Comparison to flash storage ===
SSDs based on flash memory have also been declining in cost and seeing increased usage. A key benefit of SSDs is the fast seek times and data transfer rates, easily besting LTO and disk options. However, LTO never competed in the primary storage space where SSDs excel. In the offline archival storage market, SSDs do not yet compete with LTO in terms of long term stability or low cost per unit of data storage.

== See also ==
- Optical Disc Archive, an optical-based archival format by Sony
- RDX, similar removable disk format for archive purposes
