= StorageTek tape formats =

Magnetic tape-based data storage formats

Storage Technology Corporation (marketing as 'StorageTek' [one word]) created several magnetic tape data storage formats. These are commonly used with large computer systems, typically in conjunction with a robotic tape library. The most recent format is the T10000. StorageTek primarily competed with IBM in this market, and continued to do so after its acquisition by Sun Microsystems in 2005 and as part of the Sun Microsystems acquisition by Oracle in 2009.

== Cartridge formats ==
Most (but not all) modern tape cartridges are 1/2 in (13 mm) format tape, first popularized by the IBM 3480 and DEC DLT formats. This is a small, rectangular and easily handled tape cartridge compared to the previously common 7-track and 9-track round tape reels. This form factor has proven to work well with stand alone drives and for use in automated tape libraries.

Nearly all 1/2 in (13 mm)" tape formats today are a single hub design, whereby the tape is wound onto a single hub, entirely within the external shell and presents one end for the tape drive to engage and thread into the tape drive for reading or writing. The mechanical design of this loading mechanism varies between different types of tape media and is a common source of failures. Usually the tape cartridge incorporates a switch that can be set to permit or forbid writing of data to the tape.

It is very common for the tape cartridge to be identified by an external label or sticker, which is normally both in human readable characters such as AB1023 and also in bar code, to be read by devices in an automated library.

At the end of the tape, the drive reversed the direction of tape motion, moved the read and write heads slightly vertically across the tape, and continued to write (or read) more data until the beginning of the tape was reached. This process could be repeated many times, laying down several track sets on the tape media in a serpentine recording mode. The StorageTek 9840, 9940 and T10000 drives are all serpentine recording drives.

The StorageTek SD3 drive was different, being based upon a modified video recording device. The tape advanced steadily, and data was recorded (or read) by a cylindrical head rotating at high speed and inclined at a small angle to the direction of tape motion, laying down (or reading back) a series of short data tracks very closely spaced together, helical scan.

The StorageTek 9840 series of drives used a relatively unusual dual tape hub mechanism within the 3480 format shell, similar to the familiar audio tape format. This reduced the length of tape that could be stored inside the shell, and hence reduced the data capacity of the cartridge. However, it made the loading or threading of the tape into the drive very fast, which was useful in business applications - and the drive price was very high in comparison to the contemporary LTO drive, despite having one fifth of its capacity.

Format	Release date	Native/raw data capacity (GB)	Data rate (MB/s)	Load time (s)	Reel configuration	Announcement
4480	?	0.04	3	8	single reel	
4490	?	0.80	4.5	8	single reel	
9490	1994	0.40-0.80	18-20	4.3	single reel	
SD-3	1995	10-50	11-18	17	single reel	
T9840A "Eagle"	1998	20	10	12	dual reel	
T9840B	2001	20	19	12	dual reel	
T9840C	2003	40	30	12	dual reel	
T9840D	2008	75	30	16.5	dual reel	
T9940A	2000	60	10	59	single reel	
T9940B	2002	200	30	59	single reel	
T10000	2006	500	120	62	single reel	
T10000B	2008	1000	120	16	single reel	
T10000C	2011	5000	240	13.1	single reel	
T10000D	2013	8500	252	13	single reel	
T10000E	Canceled	12000 to 16000	?	?	?	

These tape formats are popular in mainframe environments. Drives used ESCON, FICON, Fibre Channel, or SCSI interfaces.

SD-3 drive retired from use in a Powderhorn library

Close-up of the recording head of the SD-3 drive

=== SD-3 (Redwood) ===
This format used helical scan on a 1/2 in (13 mm) inch tape. Three different capacities of tape cartridge were offered: 10, 25 and 50 GB, differing only in the length of tape wound on the reels and in the external media identification character, A, B or C, which was designed to be read by the Wolfcreek and Powderhorn automated libraries' bar-code reader system.

The drive was based on a professional Panasonic video recording system, modified to be suitable for digital data recording. The result was a large, heavy drive of considerable complexity. Although somewhat difficult to maintain, it won popularity among some users due to the relatively low cost of the media per Gigabyte.

=== T10000 ===
The T10000 is the latest Oracle/Sun StorageTek tape drive and cartridge product line for mainframe and open systems. All generations of the T10000 media cartridge ('T1', 'T2', etc.) in this product family have used the same external and tape media form factors with the generational substitution of increasing data-density media. The first model, the T10000, had a native capacity of 500 GB and a native transfer rate of 120 MB/s.

This line has seen several updates, the first being the T10000B drive , which doubled storage to 1 TB on the same media cartridges as used by the T10000 drive while also providing backward read compatibility. In January 2011, the T10000C tape drive was introduced, along with a new tape cartridge—the "T10000 T2"—capable of storing 5 TB of data natively. The T10000D drive was announced in September 2013 with a native, non-compressed 8.5 TB capacity using the same T10000 T2 cartridge.

The T10000E drive was expected in 2017 with capacity in the 12-16 TB range; however, development was cancelled in 2016. Oracle continue to feature the model T10000D on their website for use in select models of StorageTek robotic tape libraries, but Oracle has adopted LTO-8 tape drives for future capacity expansion on many of their automated libraries.
