= StorageTek =

Data storage company

StorageTek (Storage Technology Corporation)
- Logo until 2009
- Type: Public
- Traded as: NYSE: STK
- Industry: Computer hardware, software
- Founded: 1969; 57 years ago
- Founders: Jesse Aweida, Juan Rodriguez, Thomas S. Kavanagh, Zoltan Herger
- Defunct: August 2005
- Fate: Acquired by Sun Microsystems, which was later acquired by Oracle Corporation
- Headquarters: Louisville, Colorado
- Products: Data storage hardware and software, professional and support services
- Revenue: $2.2 billion USD (2004)
- Number of employees: ~7,000 (2004)
- Website: storagetek.com at the Wayback Machine (archived 2004-08-02)

Storage Technology Corporation (StorageTek or STK, earlier STC) was a data storage technology company headquartered in Louisville, Colorado. New products include data retention systems, which it calls "information lifecycle management" (ILM).

Its remaining product line is now part of Oracle Corporation, and marketed as Oracle StorageTek, with a focus on tape backup equipment and software to manage storage systems.

== History ==
In 1969 four former IBM engineers—Jesse Aweida, Juan Rodriguez, Thomas S. Kavanagh, and Zoltan Herger—founded the Storage Technology Corporation. The headquarters was in Louisville, Boulder County, Colorado.

In the 1970s, StorageTek launched its Disk Products division. After a failed attempt to develop an IBM-compatible mainframe, and an optical disk product line, the company filed for Chapter 11 bankruptcy protection in 1984. Starting in 1987, new management invested in an automated tape library product line that "picked" tapes from a silo-like contraption with a robot arm. StorageTek emerged as a dominant player in that market.

StorageTek acquired Documation (1980), Aspen Peripherals Corporation (1989), Network Systems Corporation (1995), and Storability (2005).

Storage Technology Corporation was officially renamed "StorageTek" in 1983.

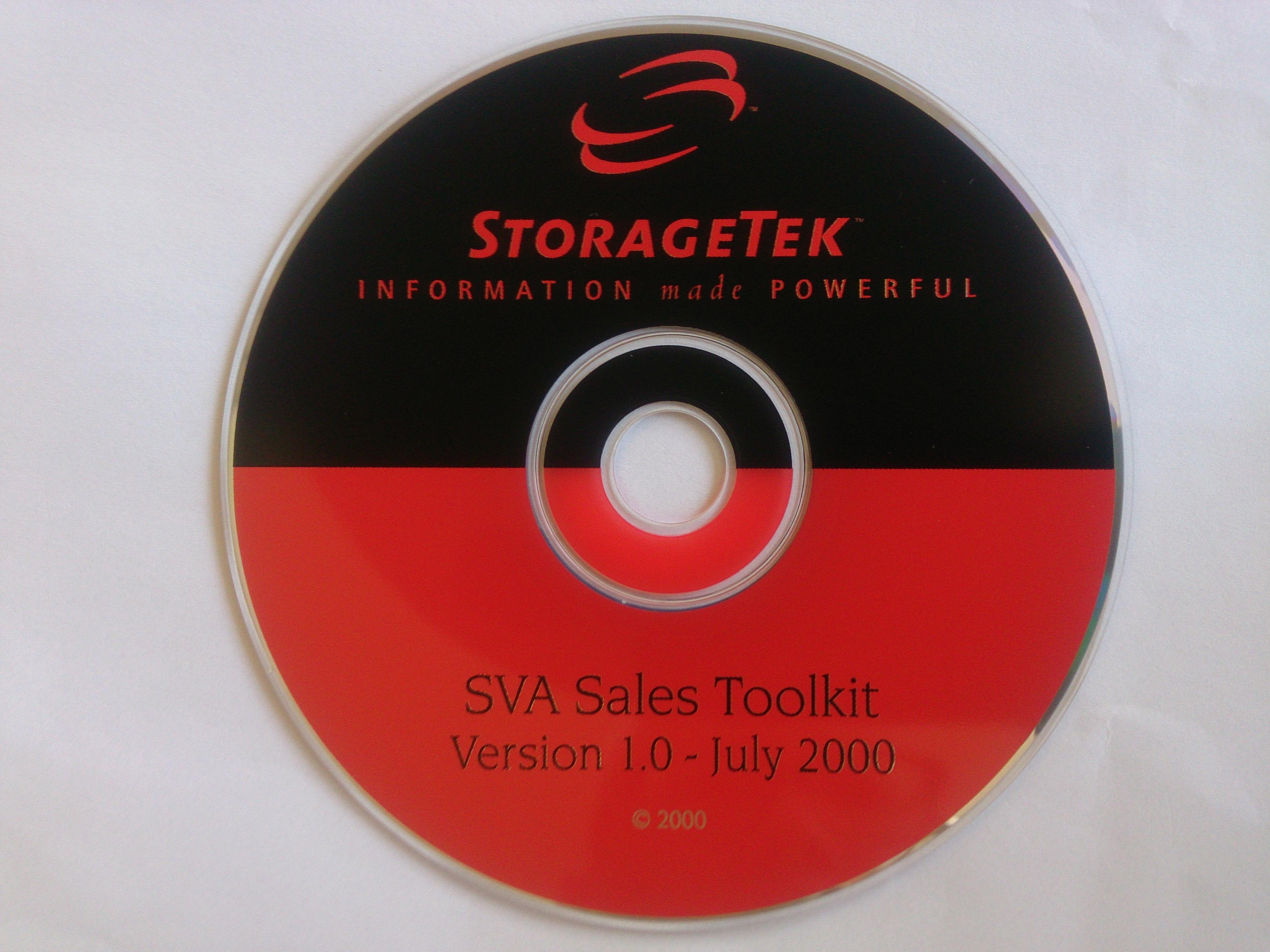
StorageTek CD-ROM containing the sales toolkit for SVA (Shared Virtual Array) hardware - July 2000

=== Sun Microsystems ===
Logo for Sun StorageTek products used prior to Oracle acquisition

In June 2005, Sun Microsystems, Inc. announced it would purchase StorageTek for US$4.1 billion in cash, or $37.00 per share. In August 2005, the acquisition was completed.

Sun shifted employees to its Broomfield, CO, campus and subsequently vacated the Louisville campus circa 2007, marking the end of the firm's significant physical presence in the area. The 432-acre campus was sold by Sun to ConocoPhillips in 2008.

=== Oracle ===
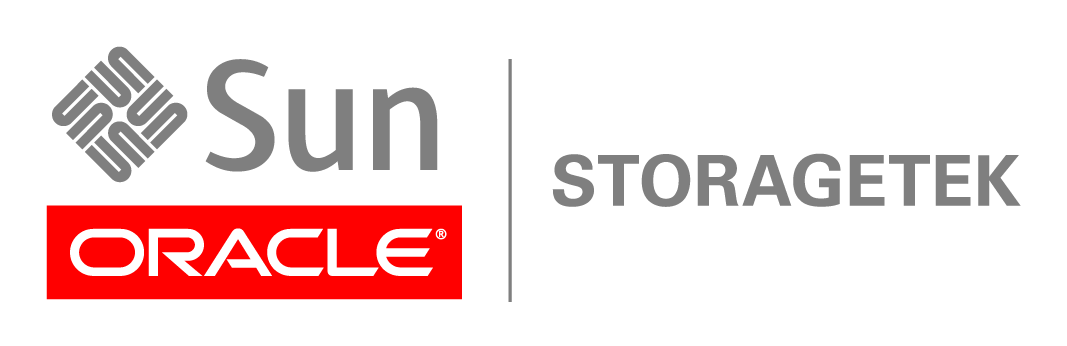
Logo for Oracle StorageTek products used after Oracle acquisition

On January 27, 2010, Sun was acquired by Oracle Corporation for US$7.4 billion. The StorageTek product line was renamed Oracle StorageTek.

== Products ==
- Disk array: ST9990, ST9985, ST6540, ST6140, Iceberg, IBM RVA, SVA, BradeStor, FLX380, FLX280, FLX240, FLX210, D178, 9176, 9153, 9140, 9130
- Disk drives: STK 8000 SuperDisk, STK8350, STK8650, STK N2700
- Fibre Channel, SAS, RAID and SCSI HBAs.
- Tape drives: STC 2450, STC 2470, STC 3400, STC 3600, StorageTek 4670, StorageTek 4480, 4490, 9490, SD-3, 9840, T9840B, T9840C, T9840D, T9940, T9940B, T10000A, T10000B, T10000C, T10000D
- Tape drives (rebranded): LTO, SDLT, DLT
- Tape libraries: 4400, 9310, 9360, 9710, 9714, 9730, 9740, 9738, L20, L40, L80, L180, L700, L700e, L5500, SL500, SL3000, SL8500, SL150, SL4000
- Virtual tape libraries: VSM1, VSM2, VSM3, VSM4, VSM5, VSM6
- Printer : StorageTek (Documation) 5000

=== Product timeline ===
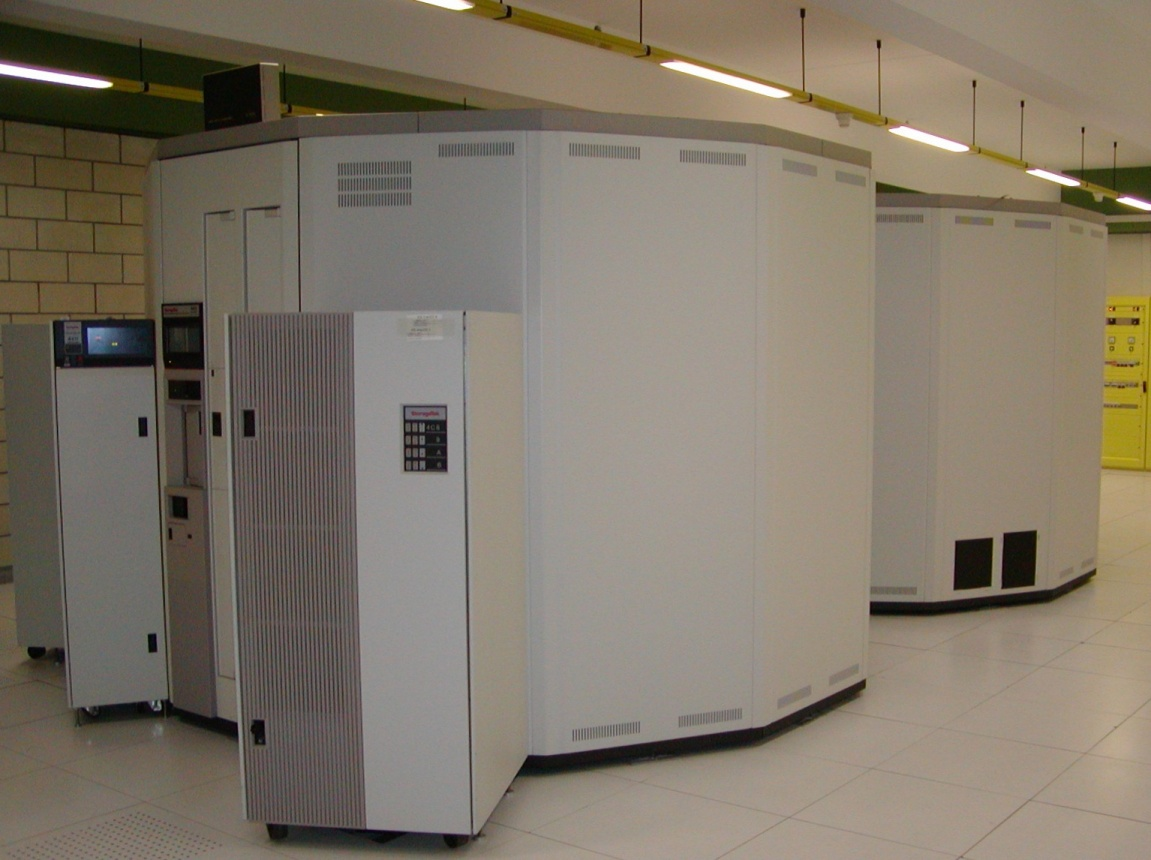
Storagetek library

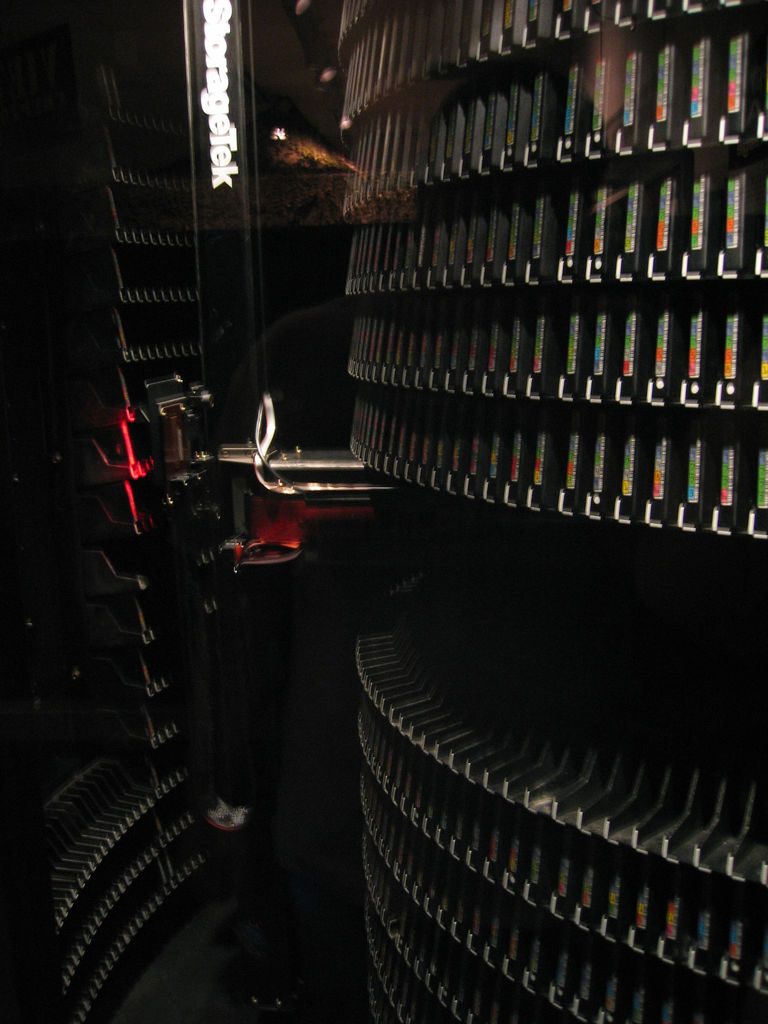
Inside view of a Powderhorn library

- 1970 - StorageTek releases its first product, the 2450/2470 tape drive.
- 1971 - StorageTek introduces the 3400 tape storage device.
- 1973 - StorageTek's disk division is founded.
- 1974 - StorageTek's first 3600 tape drive ships.
- 1975 - StorageTek ships the first 8000 Super Disk and announces the 8350 disk subsystem.
- 1978 - StorageTek develops the first solid-state disk.
- 1984 - StorageTek develops the first intelligent disk.
- 1986 - StorageTek develops the first cached disk.
- 1987 - StorageTek develops tape automation and emerges from Chapter 11.
- 1994 - StorageTek introduces virtual disk, Iceberg.
- 1998 - StorageTek introduces Flexline disk arrays.
- 2001 - StorageTek introduces virtual networking.
- 2002 - StorageTek introduces BladeStore, a disk array based on ATA disk technology.
- 2003 - StorageTek introduces the EchoView data protection appliance, a disk-based appliance that eliminates the backup window.
- 2003 - StorageTek introduces the StreamLine SL8500 modular library system.
- 2012 - Oracle introduces the Streamline SL150 modular library system.
- 2013 - Oracle introduces the T10000D 8.5 TB 252 MB/s tape drive
