= Storage capacity =

Storage capacity can refer to

- Thermal electric capacity mostly referring to solar power plants
- Energy storage capacity
- Depression storage capacity, in soil science
- Computer data storage capacity, in computing
  - Native capacity, the apparent storage capacity may differ due to compression
