= Documation =

American computer hardware manufacturer

Documation was an American Stock Exchange-listed computer hardware manufacturer founded in 1969 in Melbourne, Florida that went public in 1976. They made (punched card) card readers used in some American elections 3 decades later. They also produced Impact Line printers.

In late 1980, Storage Technology Corporation (STC) acquired Documation, which was subsequently spun off, and those companies which subdivided from it, most of which use Documation-like names, no longer manufacture computer peripherals.

Documation was described as "a financially troubled printer manufacturer."

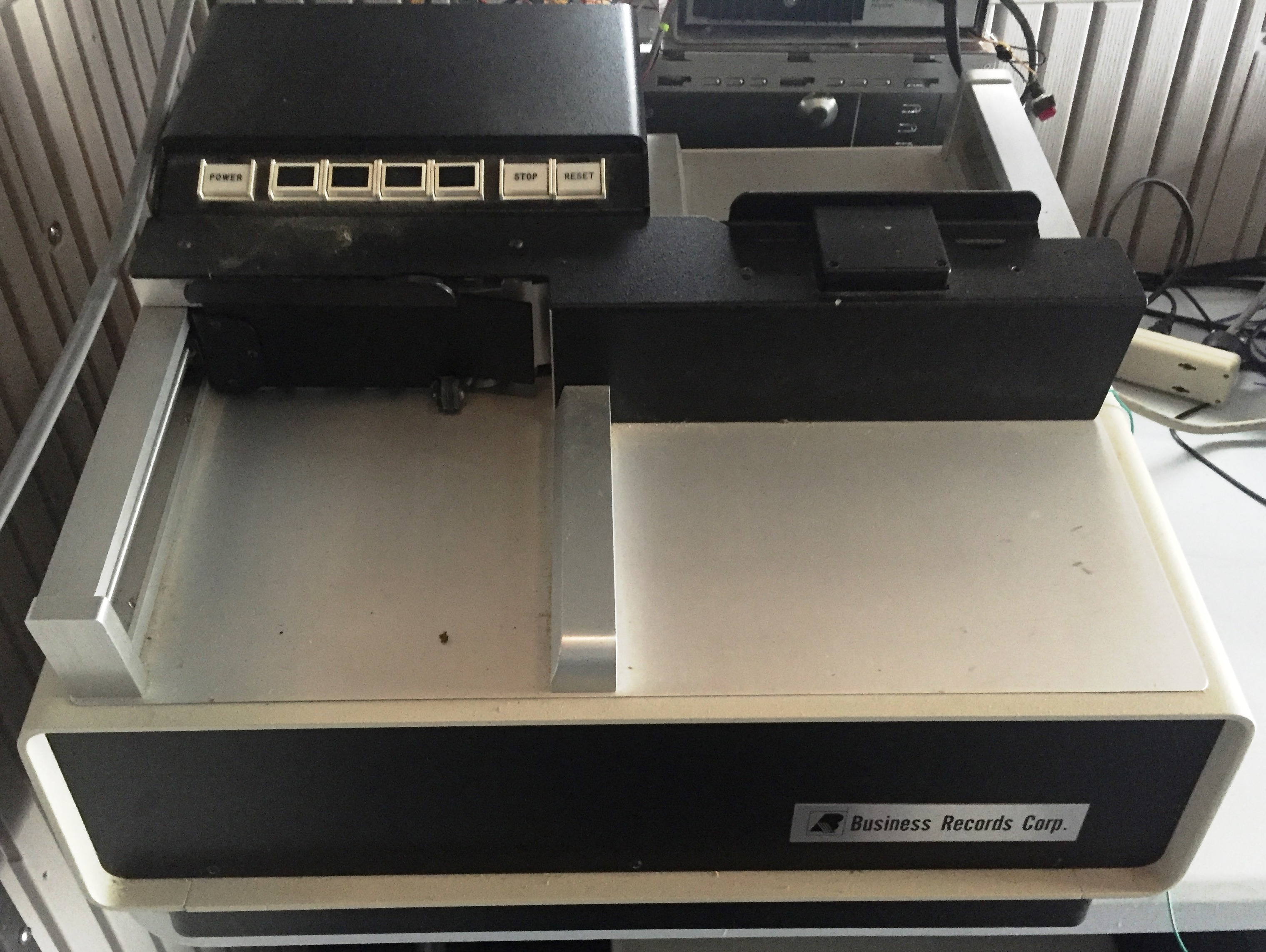
Picture of Documation M600, a machine that reads 80 column punched cards at 600 cards per minute.

== IMPACT Line printers ==
Documation's IMPACT 3000, named for its 3,000 lines per minute rating, was followed a year later by the 3,800 LPM IMPACT 3800.

A 5,000 lines per minute printer was introduced in 1986, by which time the company was operating under the name StorageTek Printer Corp. Like earlier impact printer models, it is manufactured in Florida. At the time of the Series 5000's introduction, the company said that "impact printers dominate 85 percent of the market."

The company's laser printers are rebadged from Siemens.

=== Documation's Burroughs-rebadged printers ===
Four Documation printers, rebadged by Burroughs as DOC 2000B, DOC 1800B, DOC 1500B and DOC 1250B were introduced in 1978.

Per their names, they were rated at "2,000-, 1,800-, 1,500- and 1,250" lines per minute, when using 48 character ASCII.

== Card readers ==
Among the card readers made by Documation for minicomputers in the 1970s were:

- M-200 card reader, 300 cards/minute also sold by DEC as the CR-11 card reader for the PDP-11
- M-600 card reader, 600 cards/minute, also sold by HP as 2892A and 2893A
- M-1000-L card reader 1,000 cards/minute

Their card readers have been used in elections, including the 2000 "Chads" election in Florida.

== End-user market ==
In late 1977 Documation successfully entered the end-user market. They initially focused on selling card readers to end-users; their model 6501 is IBM-compatible.

They subsequently added line printers to the equipment they sold to end-users.

== Storage Technology Corporation and thereafter ==
By 1992, the name Documation was no longer affiliated with Storage Technology Corporation in the US, but the latter still owned two Documation-named subsidiaries, one in France and the other in UK.
