= Spectra Logic =

Spectra Logic Corporation is a computer data storage company based in Boulder, Colorado in the United States. The company builds backup and archive technology for secondary storage to protect data after it migrates from primary disk. Spectra Logic's primary product is tape libraries. The company was founded in 1979, and is a privately held company.

== History ==
Nathan C. Thompson founded Spectra Logic in his apartment in 1979 while he was an engineering student at the University of Colorado at Boulder. As of 2016 Thompson is the chairman and CEO of the company.

The company became the first to automate Advanced Intelligent Tape (AIT) magnetic tape in a robotic autoloader (tape library), and was also the first tape-library vendor to implement the iSCSI networking protocol in its products. Spectra Logic produced another first when it released a tape library with integrated hardware-based data encryption.

Spectra introduced its TFinity tape library in November 2009, offering 99.9% reliability and scaling to 180 petabytes of storage capacity in an LTO-5 configuration.

In December 2010 Spectra's tape-library product line won first place in all 14 categories of Storage magazine/SearchStorage.com's 2010 Quality Awards for enterprise and midrange tape libraries. Spectra Logic again earned top honors in the 2012 Storage magazine/SearchStorage.com's Quality Awards, winning both the enterprise and midrange tape library categories. In May 2012, DCIG, LLC released a "Tape Library Buyer's Guide", which evaluated over 60 tape libraries from 8 storage vendors. Only the Spectra Logic TFinity and T950 received the highest "Best-in-Class" ranking. Also that month, Spectra Logic announced that it would provide Spectra TFinity tape libraries to the National Center for Supercomputing Applications (NCSA) for its Blue Waters supercomputing system. The TFinity tape libraries will be able to store hundreds of petabytes of data and will be one of the world's largest active file repositories.

Spectra Logic is a founding member of the Active Archive Alliance. Active archive is a method of tiered storage which gives users access to data across a virtualized file-system that migrates data between multiple storage systems.

== Spectra T950 ==
The Spectra T950 tape library stores media tapes in the tape library bundled in trays called TeraPacks. A TeraPack holds ten tapes, which increases the density of the tape storage, which the company claims simplifies the loading and unloading of the tapes from the library.

There are Spectra T950 installations in several high performance computing (HPC) facilities, including the NASA Ames Research Center, Argonne National Laboratory, and Los Alamos National Laboratory.

On 20 April 2009, NASA Ames announced that it would replace ten of its 20-year-old silo tape libraries with two Spectra Logic T950 tape libraries. This allowed the center to reclaim 1,400 square feet (130 m^{2}) of floor space and increase its storage capacity from 12 petabytes to 32 petabytes. The new tape libraries used 20,000 tape cartridge slots and Linear Tape-Open (LTO-7) drives.

== See also ==
- Tape library
- Tape drive
- Computer data storage
