= Advanced Digital Information Corporation =

American data storage technology company

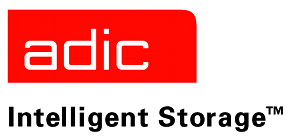
- Type: Subsidiary of Quantum Corp.
- Industry: Magnetic tape data storage & related; Software
- Headquarters: Redmond, Washington
- Key people: Peter H. van Oppen, CEO & Chairman; Jon W. Gacek, CFO
- Products: Tape drives, backup software
- Number of employees: 1,109 (2005)
- Website: www.adic.com

Advanced Digital Information Corporation (ADIC) was an American manufacturer of tape libraries and storage management software which is now part of Quantum Corp. Their product line included both hardware, such as the Scalar line of robotic tape libraries, and software, such as the StorNext File System and the StorNext Storage Manager, a Hierarchical Storage Management system. Partners and resellers included Apple, Dell, EMC, Fujitsu-Siemens, HP, IBM and Sun.

ADIC was acquired by Quantum in August 2006.
