= Metadata controller =

Computer data storage technology

Metadata controller (or MDC) is a storage area network (SAN) technology for managing file locking, space allocation and data access authorization. This is needed when several clients are given block level access to the same disk volume, data storage sharing.

MDCs are only used on high-end servers. These are never found on user computers. In the absence of MDC over a SAN there is no possible way of ensuring privacy of the stored data. This controller can also play its role as a sharing device in case the administrators allow other servers to access certain blocks in a particular SAN. The access granted to the servers is of different levels. Some times it may happen that the server is not able to see a block or make changes in it in case of a locked file. This is caused by grant of low level access. If different clients on SAN happen to know each other, access may be granted to shift a certain block from one server to another. This allows the recipient server to use the block and make changes in it.

MDCs work as enzymes. They require certain types of SANs and networks to work properly. If a controller is connected to the right network it will boost its output. In case of wrong connection i.e. with the incorrect network, it will decrease its performance.
