= Quantum Corporation =

American technology company

- Type: Public
- Traded as: Nasdaq: QMCO; FWB: QNT2
- ISIN: US7479065010
- Industry: Data storage
- Founded: 1980; 46 years ago
- Headquarters: San Jose, California, U.S.
- Key people: Hugues Meyrath (president & CEO); William H. White (CFO)
- Products: High-performance shared storage, file system, in-vehicle data capture, hyperconverged surveillance, tape storage object storage, backup appliances, data protection, and archiving products
- Revenue: ▼US$ 402.68 million (2019)
- Operating income: ▼US$ 0.8 million (2019)
- Net income: ▲US$ -42.8 million (2019)
- Number of employees: 800 (2020)
- Website: quantum.com

Quantum Corporation is a data storage, management, and protection company that provides technology to store, manage, archive, and protect video and unstructured data throughout the data life cycle. Their products are used by enterprises, media and entertainment companies, government agencies, data companies, and life science organizations. Quantum is headquartered in San Jose, California and has offices around the world.

The company was dual-listed on the NASDAQ Global Market under the ticker symbol "QMCO", and on the Börse Frankfurt under the ticker symbol "QNT2".

== History ==
Quantum was founded in 1980 as Quantum Corp. By 1984, it led the market for mid-capacity 5.25-inch drives. That year, a subsidiary was launched called Plus Development to focus on the development of hardcards. Plus Development became a successful designer of 3.5-inch drives with Matsushita Kotobuki Electronics (now Panasonic) as the contract manufacturer. By 1989, Quantum led the compact drive market.

The company had 11 new models of 3.5-inch and 2.5-inch drives, and had signed distribution agreements with Rein Elektronik in Germany and Inelco Peripheriques in France. It also merged its subsidiary Plus Development Corporation into its Commercial Products Division.

Quantum was the largest drive producer worldwide in 1994.

In 2000, Maxtor agreed to acquire Quantum's hard disk drive group. In 2004, Quantum became a member of the LTO Consortium after acquiring Certance.

In 2012, Quantum announced Q-Cloud, which combines on-premise storage with cloud storage. In 2015, the company released a multi-tier storage product, StorNext 5.3, which supports Q-Cloud and powers the company's Xcellis workflow storage technology.

In 2018, Jamie Lerner became CEO, and Quantum shifted focus from hard drives/tape to providing data storage, management, and protection for video and other unstructured data.

In 2019, the company added a subscription for cloud-based device management and product, called Distributed Cloud Services.

In 2020-2021 Quantum acquired technology to support the shift in focus including ActiveScale and CatDV. They also acquired video surveillance software from Pivot3.

During the COVID-19 pandemic, Quantum was a recipient of a government loan of US$10 million as part of the Paycheck Protection Program (PPP).

In October 2021, Quantum and IBM announced they would work together to develop LTO-10, the next generation of Linear Tape-Open (LTO) technology.

In April 2023, Quantum announced a new scale-out unstructured data storage platform called Myriad. The solution is software-defined, initially running on Quantum-supplied hardware but capable of running on public cloud infrastructure.

=== Acquisitions ===
- 1998 – ATL Products, a manufacturer of automated tape libraries.
- 1999 – Meridian Data, a network-attached storage supplier.
- 2001 – M4 Data (Holdings) Ltd., a manufacturer of tape libraries.
- 2002 – Benchmark Storage Innovations, who manufactured the VStape product line under a Quantum license.
- 2005 – Certance, the former tape business of Seagate Technology, becoming a member of the LTO consortium.
- 2006 – Advanced Digital Information Corporation (ADIC), Scalar brand tape libraries, StorNext filesystem and de-duplication technology.
- 2011 – Pancetera Software, a specialist in data management and protection for virtual environments, for $12 million.
- 2020 – ActiveScale object storage business acquired from Western Digital.
- 2020 – UK-based Square Box Systems Ltd, maker of CatDV and a specialist in data cataloging, user collaboration, and digital asset management software.
- 2021 – Video surveillance assets from Pivot3, a hyperconverged infrastructure company.
- 2021 – EnCloudEn, a hyperconverged infrastructure (HCI) software company.

== Products ==
Quantum provides data storage, management, and protection for video and other unstructured data. The company's products, solutions and services include:

=== File system software ===
==== StorNext ====
Quantum's StorNext software enables video editing and management of large video and image datasets. StorNext software is a parallel file processing system providing fast streaming performance and data access, a shared file storage environment for MacOS, Microsoft Windows, and Linux workstations, and intelligent data management to protect data across its lifecycle. StorNext's storage arrays include the hybrid Quantum QXS-Series. StorNext is also integrated with tape storage and can assign infrequently used but important data to tape to create a large-scale active archive.

In 2011, the company added the StorNext appliance offerings to its product family. In addition to the StorNext Archive Enabled Library (AEL), the company added a metadata controller (StorNext M330), a scale-out gateway appliance (G300), and several scalable storage systems (QM1200, QS1200 and QD6000). In February 2012, the company added the QS2400 Storage System, followed in May by the M660 metadata appliance.

The HSeries is a line of high-performance storage arrays. In January 2021, Quantum introduced its H2000 series of hybrid arrays that provide on-premise storage for media production workflows and block storage arrays that provide an alternative to QXS. It includes the 2U H2012 and the H2024, which provides 307 TB after data reduction. The H4000 appliance series was released in late 2021. The series uses a converged infrastructure that runs file, block, and client services virtually on a single box.

In April 2022, Quantum released the H4000 Essential. It is for small, independent creative teams and provides shared storage and automatic content indexing, discovery, and workflow collaboration by combining Quantum's CatDV asset management and the company's StorNext 7 shared storage software.

==== F-Series NVMe ====
In April 2019, Quantum introduced F-Series, a new line of NVMe storage arrays “designed for performance, availability, and reliability.” Non-volatile memory express (NVMe) flash drives allow for massive parallel processing, while the latest Remote Direct Memory Access (RDMA) networking technology provides direct access between workstations and the NVMe storage devices. These hardware features are combined with the Quantum Cloud Storage Platform and the StorNext file system to provide storage capabilities for post-production houses, broadcasters and other rich media environments.

In April 2022, the company's F2100 NVMe storage appliance was released as the latest in the F-Series line It provides 50 GB/s for multi-client reads and up to 737 TB of raw NVMe storage, which was an increase from previous F-Series products. To provide proactive system monitoring, it was integrated with Quantum Cloud-Based Analytics software.

==== Xcellis ====
The Quantum Xcellis product line was released in 2015. The first products were designed for disk and SSDs. In 2018, the company added nonvolatile memory express to its Xcellis NAS appliances. The NVMe Xcellis option was designed for flash storage.

=== Tape storage ===
Since 1994, when it acquired the Digital Linear Tape product line from Digital, Quantum has sold tape storage products, including tape drives, media and automation.

==== LTO tape drives and media ====
In 2007, Quantum discontinued development of the DLT line in favor of Linear Tape-Open (LTO), which it began selling in 2005 following its acquisition of Certance. LTO is an open tape format designed for high-capacity long-term storage. It is often used for large-scale cold storage.

In September 2020, Quantum, IBM, and Hewlett Packard Enterprise released the specifications for LTO-9 storage tape technology. Products using this technology were available a year later. In 2021, Quantum partnered with IBM on its development of LTO-10 tape drives and media.

==== Scalar tape libraries ====
In 2012, Quantum introduced its Scalar LTFS (Linear Tape File System) appliance, which offers new modes of portability and user accessibility for archived content on LTO tape.

In 2016, Quantum refreshed its Scalar LTO tape library family and added an appliance for rich media archiving. The three new systems are part of the Quantum Scalar Storage Platform aimed at handling large-scale unstructured data. The Scalar i3 and i6 was introduced with support for LTO-6 and LTO-7 tapes, supporting LTO-9 today. The Quantum Scalar i3 is designed for small to medium-sized businesses and departmental configurations. It scales up to 3 PB in a 12U rack space. The Quantum Scalar i6 is a midrange library for small enterprises. It scales up to 12 PB within a single 48U rack.

The StorNext AEL6 archiving appliance combines the Quantum Scalar i6 library with Quantum's StorNext data management software for archive storage. It has self-healing auto-migration and targets rich media use cases. In 2021, Quantum introduced Scalar Ransom Block to prevent ransomware attacks on its Scalar tape libraries.

=== Backup appliances ===
==== DXi-Series ====
Quantum introduced its first disk-based backup and recovery product, the DX30, in 2002 and has continued to build out this product line.

At the end of 2006, shortly after its acquisition of Advanced Digital Information Corporation (ADIC), Quantum announced the first of its DXi-Series products incorporating data deduplication technology which ADIC had acquired from a small Australian company called Rocksoft earlier that year. Quantum expanded and enhanced this product line.

DXi-Series products incorporate Quantum's data deduplication technology, providing typical data reduction ratios of 15:1 or 93%. The company offers both target and source-based deduplication as well as integrated path-to-tape capability. DXi works with all major backup applications, including Symantec's OpenStorage (OST) API, Oracle SBT API, Veeam DMS, and supports everything from remote offices to corporate data centers. Quantum includes almost all software licenses for each model in the base price.

In 2011, in addition to its DXi-Series of disk backup products, Quantum offered its RDX removable disk libraries and NDX-8 NAS appliances for data protection in small business environments. In 2012, Quantum announced a virtual deduplication appliance, the DXi V1000.

In January, 2019, Quantum refreshed its DXi series, with the addition of the DXi9000 and DXi4800. The DXi9000 targets the enterprise market, scaling from 51 TB to 1 petabyte of usable capacity. The 12 TB hard drives allow for more storage using less physical space. The DXi4800 is a smaller-scale appliance targeting midmarket organizations and remote sites.

In 2021, Quantum replaced the V2000 and V4000 with the DXi V5000. The DXi is offered in both virtual and physical appliances, used by remote and branch offices that need a backup target system.

=== Virtual machine data protection ===
Quantum's vmPRO software and appliances were used for protecting virtual machine (VM) data. vmPRO software worked with DXi appliances and users' existing backup applications to integrate VM backup and recovery into their existing data protection processes.

In March 2012, Quantum announced that its vmPRO technology and DXi V1000 virtual appliance had been selected by Xerox as a key component of the company's cloud backup and disaster recovery (DR) services.

In August 2012, Quantum announced Q-Cloud, its own branded cloud-based data protection service, which is also based on vmPRO and DXi technology.

=== Media asset management software ===
CatDV is a media management and workflow automation platform that helps organizations manage large volumes of unstructured data such as video, images, audio files, and PDF digital assets. The software catalogs and analyzes these files and can be used with Quantum's StorNext file storage.

In April 2022, the company released the NVIDIA AI platform to provide AI and machine learning (ML) to video production and data management workflows via CatDV software. The new platform combines the CatDV asset management and automation platform, NVIDIA A2 Tensor Core GPU infrastructure, and the NVIDIA Deepstream, Riva, and Maxine software development kits.

=== Object storage ===
==== Lattus ====
In late 2012, Quantum introduced the Lattus product family OEMed from Amplidata, an object storage system composed of storage nodes, access nodes and controller nodes for large data stores. Lattus-X was the first disk-based archive in the Lattus family that includes a native HTTP REST interface, and CIFS and NFS access to applications.

==== ActiveScale software and systems ====
In 2020, Quantum entered into an agreement with Western Digital Technologies, Inc. to acquire its ActiveScale object storage business. ActiveScale allows companies to manage, protect, and preserve unstructured data, from a few hundred terabytes to tens of petabytes. It is used in industries such as media and entertainment, surveillance, big data, genomics, HPC, telecom, and medical imaging.

In 2021, Quantum released subscription-based ActiveScale 6.0.

==== Cold storage archives ====
In October 2021, Quantum introduced ActiveScale Cold Storage as a storage-as-a-service (STaaS) offering. It combines the company's tape technology with the ActiveScale object storage platform. It is also used to store, migrate, and restore objects to and from the cold archives.

=== Video surveillance storage ===
Quantum has a number of products that capture and store video data, including video recording servers and hyperconverged storage systems. The VS-HCI series provides hyperconverged infrastructure for surveillance recording and video management.

In July 2021, Quantum acquired assets and intellectual property from Pivot3, a hyperconverged infrastructure technology company. Pivot3's video surveillance appliances, NVRs, management applications, and scale-out hyperconverged software are sold under Quantum's VS-Series product portfolio. In August 2021, Quantum acquired EnCloudEn, a hyperconverged infrastructure software company.

In March 2022, the company released the Unified Surveillance Platform (USP). The software platform could be used to record and store video surveillance data and runs on standard servers.

=== Autonomous vehicle edge storage ===
Quantum's R-Series Edge Storage is a ruggedized storage system that captures large amounts of data generated by vehicles. The removable storage allows the data to be quickly transferred to a centralized data center.

=== Fireball ===
The Fireball brand of hard drives were manufactured between 1995 and 2001. In 1995, 540 MB Fireball hard drives using ATA and SCSI were available. In 1997, the Fireball ST, available in 1.6 GB to 6.4 GB capacities, was considered a top performer, while the Fireball TM was significantly slower.
