= Native capacity =

In computing, native capacity is the uncompressed storage capacity of any medium that is usually spoken of in compressed sizes. For example, tape cartridges are rated in compressed capacity, which usually assumes 2:1 compression ratio over the native capacity.
