= Tape library =

Storage device containing a robot which automatically loads tapes into tape drives

In computer storage, a tape library is a physical area that holds magnetic data tapes. In an earlier era, tape libraries were maintained by people known as tape librarians and computer operators and the proper operation of the library was crucial to the running of batch processing jobs. Although tape libraries of this era were not automated, the use of tape management system software could assist in running them.

Subsequently, tape libraries became physically automated, and as such are sometimes called a tape silo, tape robot, or tape jukebox. These are a storage devices that contain one or more tape drives, a number of slots to hold tape cartridges, a barcode reader to identify tape cartridges, and an automated method for loading tapes (a robot). Such solutions are mostly used for backups and for digital archiving. Additionally, the area where tapes that are not currently in a silo are stored is also called a tape library. One of the earliest examples was the IBM 3850 Mass Storage System (MSS), announced in 1974.

In either era, tape libraries can contain millions of tapes.

== Manual era ==
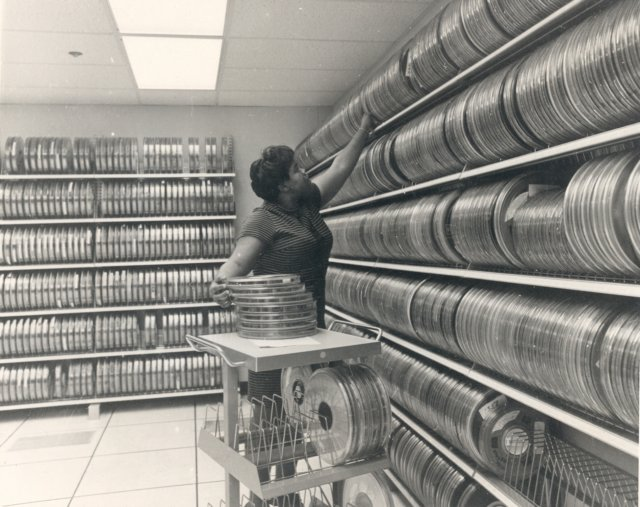
A manual magnetic tape library, common in the 1960s and 1970s. Rolling carts are used by staff to transfer tapes between the racks in the library and the computer room where the tape drives reside.

=== Tapes and batch processing ===
In the mainframe computer era, especially the IBM mainframe, the most common format in use was the 9-track tape. Some large application systems could require scores of different tapes as part of their batch job runs.

In the data processing applications of the era, the master files for such things as employee payroll information, supplies and stores inventory, or customer accounts were typically kept on tape. Batch jobs to update these master files would take the existing tape master file as input and write out a new tape master file as output. In addition, the set of update transactions themselves might constitute a second input tape. The master file output of one update job would then be the master file input to the next time the job is run, perhaps a day, a week, or a month later. The tapes representing a few past iterations of a master file would typically be retained, in case a problem with the latest version were to be discovered and the job had to be rerun.

=== Role of tape libraries and librarians ===
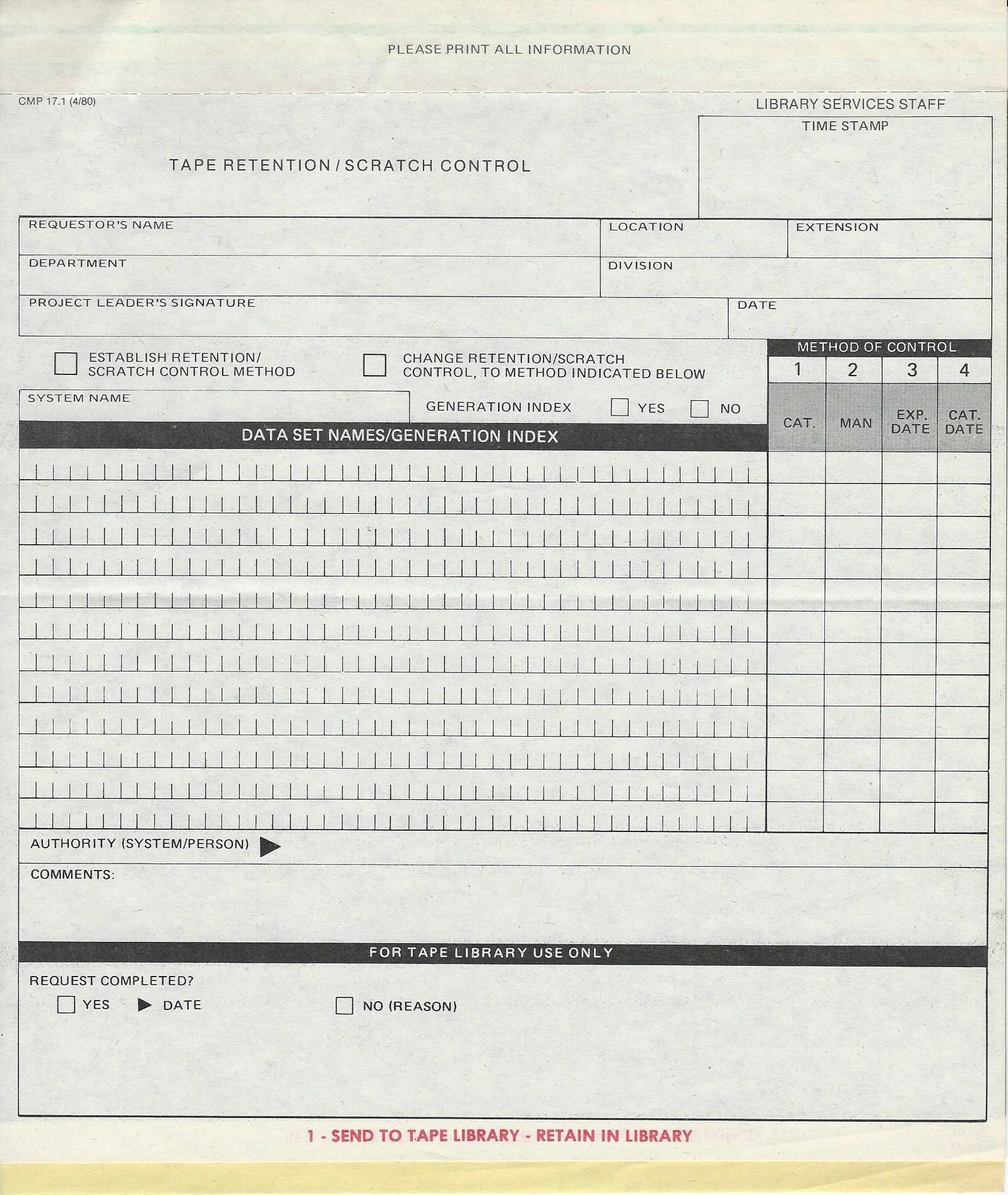
Tape Retention / Scratch Control form, in triplicate

Mainframe computer installations often had a separate room, the tape library, to house their racks and cabinets of tapes. The typical workflow for running a batch job was to go into the library, pull certain tapes off the racks there and load them onto a rolling cart, move the cart into the computer area, mount the tapes onto tape drives for a production run, take the tapes off the drives when the run was over, move the cart back to the library, and put the tapes back on the library racks. Such tape libraries existed at most computer installations.

Even a modestly sized computer installation could have hundreds of tapes, and library sizes of several thousand reels of tapes were commonplace. And they could be much larger: by the mid-1970s, the U.S. Census Bureau and NASA each had tape libraries with around one million tape reels in them. The person in charge of all this was typically called the tape librarian.

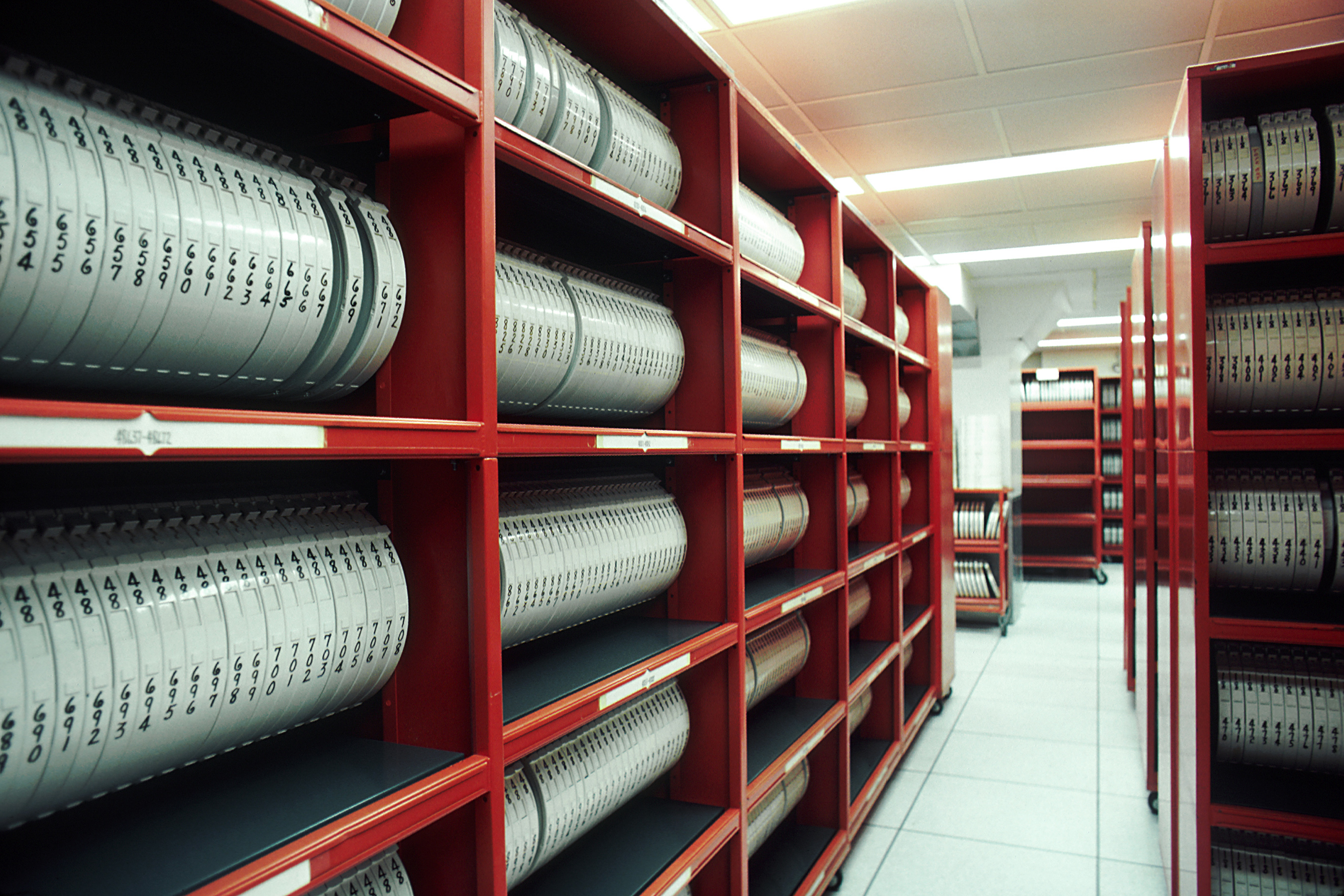
Shelves full of tape reels at the National Cancer Institute

In this era, there were no automated tape delivery and mounting systems, and so this action had to be done by computer operators. These people were the ones responsible for mounting tapes onto tape drives as part of running a job. Even careful computer operators could sometimes mount the wrong tape as input to a job or present the reels of a multi-tape dataset out of order. Overwriting a tape that was meant to be preserved was another potential mistake.

It was the tape librarian's responsibility to set up procedures for the handling of tapes to minimize the chances of errors taking place. As one book of the era wrote, "keeping track of the whereabouts of the tapes is a formidable and responsible job."

=== Supporting software ===
Tape management systems of this era were software packages whose purpose was to help facilitate tape library operations and management. They kept track of data sets on tape, and produced reports indicating whether a data set should be retained on, or could be scratched from, a tape; they aided in the setup and running of scheduled production jobs, through such things as tape pull lists and pre-printed external gummed tape labels; and they kept track of the physical inventory of tape reels. The most popular of these packages was UCC-1 from University Computing Company, a product that was also known as the Tape Management System. It made several appearances on Datapro Research Corporation's Software Honor Roll. Another was Valu-Lib from Value Computing, Inc., and a third was TLMS II from Capex Corporation.

As use of the mainframe continued on into the following century, tape library management, both manual and automatic, was one element of the offerings of the Data Facility Storage Management Subsystem (MVS) from IBM.

== Automated era ==
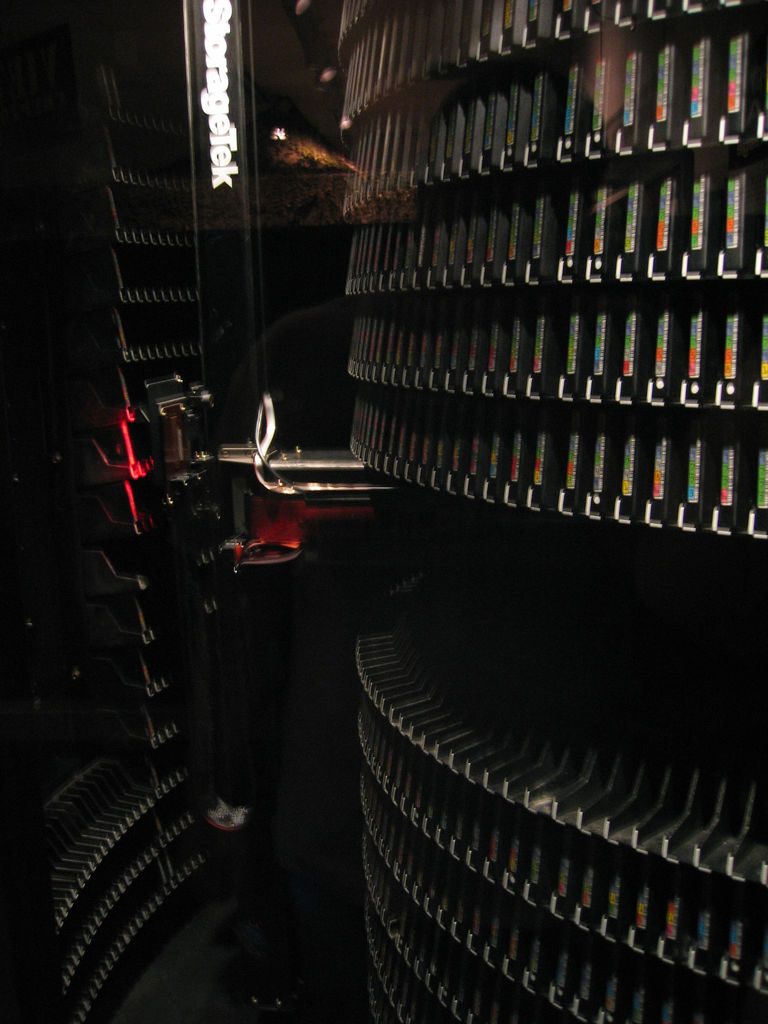
Large StorageTek Powderhorn tape library, showing tape cartridges with barcodes packed on shelves in the front and a robot arm moving in the back

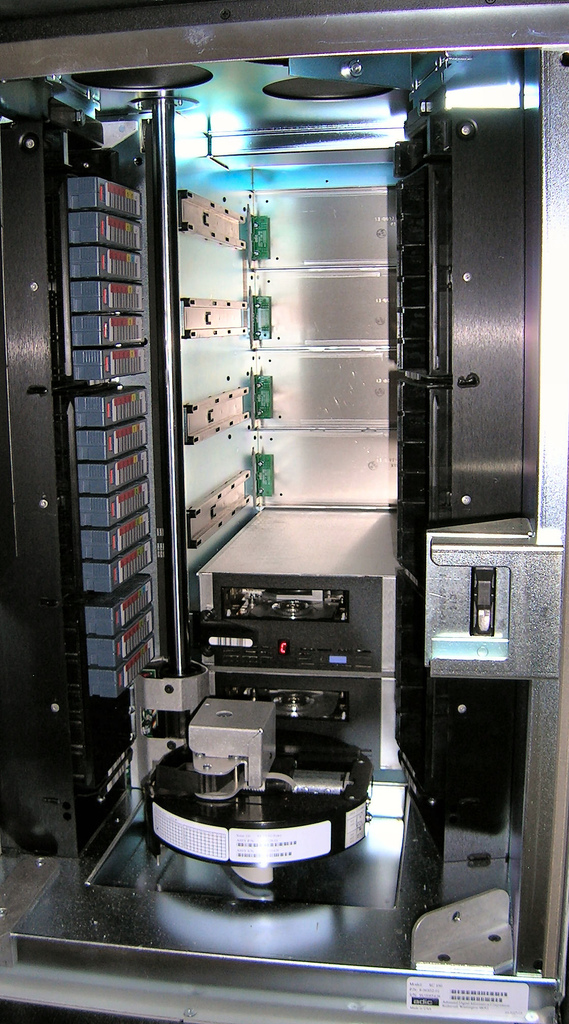
Small ADIC Scalar 100 tape library, showing a robot visible on the bottom with two IBM LTO2 tape drives behind it

=== Design ===
Physically automated tape library devices can store immense amounts of data, ranging from 20 terabytes up to 2.1 exabytes of data as of 2016. Such capacity is multiple thousand times that of a typical hard drive and well in excess of what is capable with network attached storage. Typical entry-level solutions cost around $10,000 USD, while high-end solutions can start at as much as $200,000 USD and cost well in excess of $1 million for a fully expanded and configured library.

For large data-storage, they are a cost-effective solution, with cost per gigabyte as low as 2 cents USD. The tradeoff for their larger capacity is their slower access time, which usually involves mechanical manipulation of tapes. Access to data in a library takes from several seconds to several minutes.

Because of their slow sequential access and huge capacity, tape libraries are primarily used for backups and as the final stage of digital archiving. A typical application of the latter would be an organization's extensive transaction record for legal or auditing purposes. Another example is hierarchical storage management (HSM), in which tape library is used to hold rarely used files from file systems.

=== Software support ===
There are several large-scale library-management packages available commercially. Open-source implementations include AMANDA, Bacula, and the minimal mtx program.

=== Barcode labels ===
Tape libraries commonly have the capability of optically scanning barcode labels which are attached to each tape, allowing them to automatically maintain an inventory of which tapes are where within the library. Preprinted barcode labels are commercially available or custom labels may be generated using commercial or free software. The barcode label is frequently part of the tape label, information recorded at the beginning of the medium to uniquely identify the tape.

=== Autoloaders ===
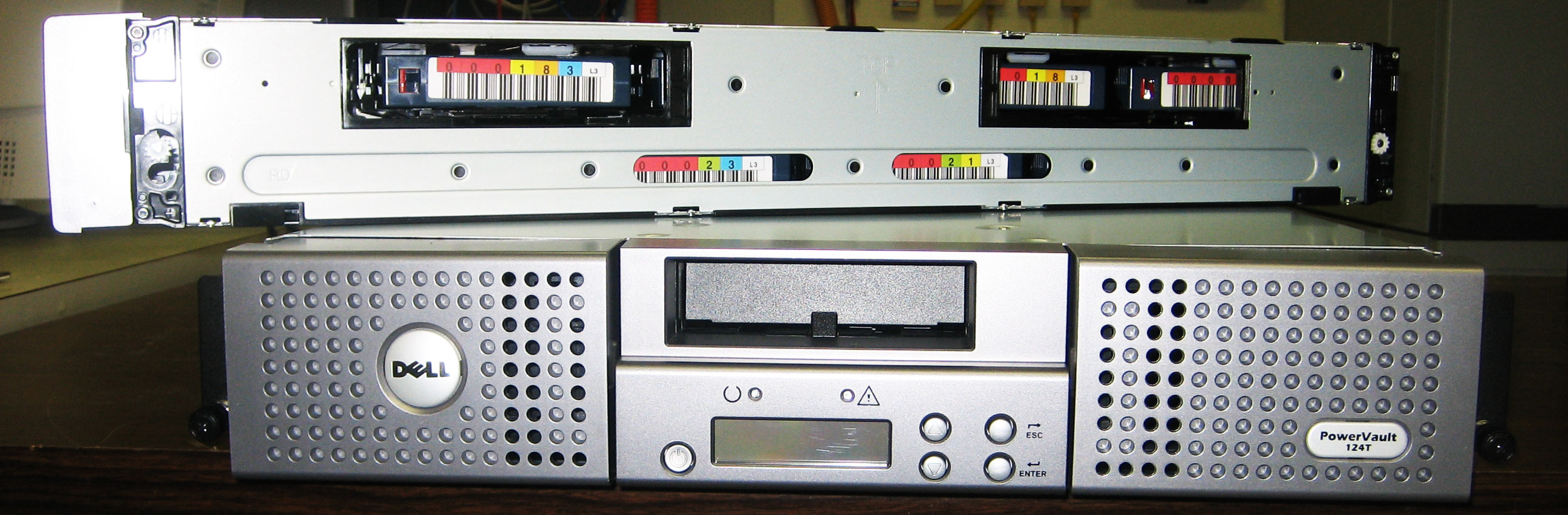
Dell PowerVault 124T Autoloader

Smaller tape libraries with only one drive are known as autoloaders. The term autoloader is also sometimes used synonymously with stacker, a device in which the media are loaded necessarily in a sequential manner.

Other types of autoloaders may operate with optical discs (such as compact discs or DVDs) or floppy disks.

== See also ==
- Optical jukebox
