= List of Harvey Mudd College people =

This is a list of notable alumni and faculty of Harvey Mudd College, Claremont, California, United States.

== Academia ==
- James Enstrom, 1965, physicist, epidemiologist
- Robert L. Smith, 1966, engineer
- Jerrold B. Tunnell, 1972, mathematician
- Roger T. Howe, 1979, Professor Emeritus in Electrical Engineering, Stanford University.

== Astronauts and aeronautics ==
- Stan Love, 1987, astronaut, crew member for Space Shuttle Atlantis STS-122, "capcom" or communications officer with the International Space Station
- George "Pinky" Nelson, 1972, astronaut, flew on three Space Shuttle program missions, second American to walk in space without a tether to a spacecraft
- Iris Cummings, Olympian, aviator, and sponsor of the flying club.

== Entertainment ==
- Sean "Day9" Plott, 2008, professional StarCraft player and commentator who represented the United States in the 2004 and 2005 World Cyber Games Grand Finals; won the 2007 WCG Pan American Championship
- Scott Stokdyk, 1991, Academy Award winner for best visual effects for Spider-Man 2; Visual Effects Supervisor at Sony Pictures Imageworks
- Michael Tapper, 2000, former member of the band We Are Scientists
- Michael G. Wilson, 1963, producer of the James Bond series of films

== Software and engineering ==
- Donald D. Chamberlin, 1966, co-inventor of SQL (database query language) and IBM representative to the working group developing the XQuery language
- Joseph Costello, 1974, chairman and CEO of think3, former president and CEO of Cadence Design Systems
- Ned Freed, 1982, co-author of the MIME email standard (RFCs 2045-2049)
- Robert Freitas, 1974, Feynman Prize in Nanotechnology (2009)
- Nabeel Gareeb, CEO of MEMC Electronic Materials, Inc.
- Jonathan Gay, 1989, creator of Adobe Flash software
- Bruce Nelson, 1974, inventor of the remote procedure call for computer communications
- Tom Preston-Werner (dropped out), co-founder of GitHub, creator of Gravatar
- Sage Weil, 2000, co-founder of WebRing, DreamHost, Inktank, and Ceph

== Politics ==
- Richard H. Jones, 1972, former US ambassador to Israel, Kuwait, Kazakhstan, and Lebanon; chief policy officer and deputy administrator of the Coalition Provisional Authority in Iraq
- Amanda Simpson, 1983, executive director of the Army Energy Initiatives Task Force, Department of Defense

== Business ==
- Eric B. Kim, 1976, chief marketing officer of Intel, former CMO of Samsung Electronics

== Miscellaneous ==
- Joe Pelton, 2000, professional poker player, winner of 2006 Legends of Poker tournament

== Notable faculty ==
- William B. Allen
- Arthur T. Benjamin
- Nathaniel Davis
- Weiqing Gu
- Maria Klawe
- Ran Libeskind-Hadas
- Lisette de Pillis
- Nick Pippenger
- Francis Su
- Talithia Williams
