= Prosper (name) =

Prosper is both a given male name and a surname. Notable people with the name include:

== People with the given name ==
- Prosper of Aquitaine (c. 390–c. 455), also known as Prosper Tiro, Christian saint, writer and disciple of St Augustine
- Prosper of Reggio (died 466), bishop of Reggio Emilia and saint
- Prosper of Reggio Emilia (theologian) (died 1332/3), Augustinian scholar
- Prosper or Prospero Alpini (1553–1617), Venetian physician and botanist
- Prosper Ahiabu (born 1999), Ghanaian footballer
- Prosper Arsenault (1894–1987), Canadian educator and politician
- Prosper Avril (born 1937), President of Haiti from 1988 to 1990
- Prosper Boulanger (1918–2002), Canadian politician and businessman
- Prosper Jolyot de Crébillon (1674–1762), French poet and tragedian
- Prosper Dérivis (1808–1880), French operatic bass
- Prosper Garnot (1794–1838), French surgeon and naturalist
- Prosper Giquel (1835–1886), French naval officer and mercenary in China
- Prosper Guéranger (1805–1875), French Benedictine priest, abbot and founder of the French Benedictine Congregation
- Prosper Henry (1849–1903), French optician and astronomer
- Prosper Higiro (born 1961), Rwandan politician
- Prosper Karangwa (born 1978), Canadian basketball executive and former player
- Prosper L'Orange (1876–1939), German engineer and inventor
- Prosper de Mestre (1789–1844), businessman in Sydney, Australia
- Prosper Mérimée (1803–1870), French writer
- Prosper Montagné (1865–1948), French chef and author
- Prosper Padera (born 2006), Zimbabwean footballer
- Prosper Poullet (1868–1937), Belgian politician
- Prosper Sainton (1813–1890), French violinist and conductor
- Prosper Utseya (born 1985), Zimbabwean cricketer
- Prosper Lanchantin-Valmore (1793-1881), French stage actor and second husband of poet Marceline Desbordes-Valmore
- Prosper Weil (1926–2018), French lawyer
- "Prosper", codename of Francis Suttill, Special Operations Executive agent in World War II Occupied France

== People with the surname ==
- Cassandre Prosper (born 2005), Canadian basketball player
- Harrison Prosper, Dominican-born British-American physicist, father of Olivia
- Lester Prosper (born 1988), Indonesian basketball player
- Olivia Prosper, French-born American mathematical biologist, daughter of Harrison
- Olivier-Maxence Prosper (born 2002), Canadian basketball player
- Peter Prosper (born 1969), Trinidadian footballer
- Pierre-Richard Prosper (born 1963), American lawyer

== Fictional characters with the name ==
- Prosper, fictional orphaned protagonist of the children's novel The Thief Lord by Cornelia Funke

== See also ==
- Prosper family murders, triple homicide in the UK in 2024
