= Saint Prosper =

Saint Prosper may refer to:

- Prosper of Aquitaine (c. 390–c. 455), Christian writer and disciple of Saint Augustine of Hippo
- Prosper of Reggio (died 466), Italian saint

Saint-Prosper may refer to:

- Saint-Prosper, Chaudière-Appalaches, Quebec, Canadian municipality
- Saint-Prosper-de-Champlain, Quebec, Canadian municipality

== See also ==
- Prosper (disambiguation)
