= SUSE Enterprise Storage =

Linux-based computer data storage

SUSE Enterprise Storage (SES)
- Original author: SUSE
- Developer: SUSE
- Stable release: 7.0 / October 2020; 5 years ago
- Operating system: Linux
- Type: Distributed object store
- Website: www.suse.com/products/suse-enterprise-storage/

SUSE Enterprise Storage (SES) is a Linux-based computer data storage product developed by SUSE and built on Ceph technology. The second major release was available in November, 2015, and announced at SUSECon 2015.

New features in 2.0 include cross-platform support in addition to the native Linux kernel and other RADOS-powered endpoints. Adding iSCSI, the ability to connect block storage to any system, even Microsoft Windows, meant an enterprise-grade software-defined storage system was now available for every major operating system supporting an iSCSI initiator.

== Features ==
New features in SES 2.0 were the iSCSI target, encryption, simpler implementation with a Crowbar appliance used for SUSE OpenStack Cloud integration, and relationships with partners to bring Ceph to ARM-based hardware.

SUSE Enterprise Storage and Ceph recommend against traditional fault-tolerance technologies, such as RAID. Ceph provides full duplication of all data so that loss of any single copy leaves at least two others (by default) available from which a new copy can be created and clients can continue to be serviced.

Because the data are duplicated in their entirety, disk-based duplication via RAID is redundant, reducing overall capacity, and is therefore not encouraged. This design also makes mixing and matching sizes and types of disks possible, and allows for commodity grade hardware to be used cutting costs on the storage environment. The presence of multiple copies of data also provides clients with the ability to achieve greater read performance by pulling data from multiple disks simultaneously.

Another feature of Ceph-based storage is the ability to define, via policy, the type of storage used for different types of data. This means that data can be stored more than the default three times providing higher redundancy and performance if deemed important, and it can also be stored on faster or slower disks depending on the business needs. The policies can go as far as to define redundant storage in multiple servers, multiple racks, multiple datacenter, or on different continents, all depending on the needs of the business or system administrator. Cache Tiering can also be used to help write performance by sending writes to cache to faster disks.

SUSE Enterprise Storage 5, based on the Ceph Luminous release, broadens the scope and use cases for the SUSE Software Defined Storage solution. BlueStore, a new native object storage backend increases performance by up to a factor of two, whilst a more pervasive support of erasure coding increases the efficiency of a fault tolerant solution. Efficiency is enhanced with compression capabilities.

SUSE Enterprise Storage 6 is based on the Ceph Nautilus release and built on SUSE Linux Enterprise Server 15 SP1. SES 6 delivers new features focused on containerized and cloud workload support, improved integration with public cloud, and enhanced data protection capabilities.

SUSE Enterprise Storage 7 is based on the Octopus release of the open source Ceph technology and built on SUSE Linux Enterprise Server 15 SP2. It introduces a Windows driver for Ceph.

In March 2021 SUSE stated that they were no longer developing or selling support SUSE Enterprise Storage. Existing support for SES7 would expire 31 January 2023.

== History ==
SUSE Enterprise Storage 1.0 was released as an add-on to the popular SUSE Linux Enterprise Server 12. As an add-on, it took advantage of the enterprise Linux stack available as part of SLES 12, and then provided highly-available, highly replicated, and high-performing storage which could be exposed via RADOS or iSCSI to other clients.

SUSE Enterprise Storage (SES 5) was announced at SUSECon in September, 2017 and released in November, 2017
