= Prosperity (disambiguation) =

Prosperity is the state of having wealth or good fortune.

Prosperity may also refer to:

== Places in the United States ==
- Prosperity, Florida, an unincorporated community
- Prosperity, Indiana, an unincorporated town
- Prosperity, Missouri, an unincorporated community
- Prosperity, Pennsylvania, an unincorporated community
- Prosperity, South Carolina, a town
- Prosperity, West Virginia, a census-designated place
- Prosperity, U.S. Virgin Islands, a settlement

== Film and television ==
- Prosperity (film), 1932 American pre-Code comedy-drama film starring Marie Dressler
- Prosperity (Irish TV series), an Irish television drama series
- Prosperity (Singaporean TV series), a Singaporean Chinese family drama

== Other uses ==
- As-Salam Palace, one of Saddam Hussein's palaces taken over by coalition forces and called "Camp Prosperity" or "Forward Operating Base Prosperity"

== See also ==
- Prosperity theology, a Charismatic Christian belief
- Prosper (disambiguation)
