= Webring =

Group of websites linked in a ring structure

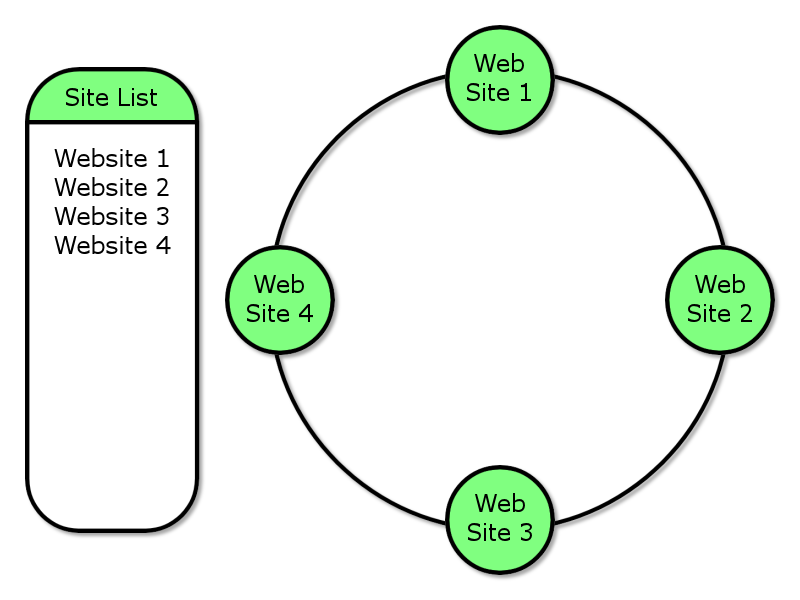

A webring (or web ring) is a collection of websites linked together in a circular structure, usually organized around a specific theme, and often educational or social. They were popular in the 1990s and early 2000s, particularly among amateur websites.

To be a part of the webring, each site has a common navigation bar; it contains links to the previous and next sites. By selecting next (or previous) repeatedly, the user will eventually loop back to the site where they started; this loop is the "ring" in the term "webring." However, the select-through route around the ring is usually supplemented by a central site with links to all member sites; this prevents the ring from breaking completely if a member site goes offline. A webring is managed from one website which is able to omit the websites that have dropped out or are no longer reachable. The advantage of a webring is that if the user is interested in the topic on one website, they can quickly connect to another website on the same topic. Webrings usually have a moderator who decides which pages to include in the webring. After approval, webmasters add their pages to the ring by 'linking in' to the ring; this requires adding the necessary HTML or JavaScript to their site.

Sites usually join a webring in order to receive traffic from related sites. When used to improve search engine rankings, webrings can be considered a search engine optimization technique.

Webrings are mainly viewed as a relic of the early web of the 1990s. When the primary site that managed web rings, webring.org, was acquired by Yahoo, "ring masters" lost access to their webrings and the web ring hubs were replaced by a Yahoo page. By the time Yahoo stopped controlling webring.org in 2001, search engines had become good enough that web rings were no longer as useful. The webring.org site was still active in the mid-2010s.

== WebRing.com ==
Denis Howe started EUROPa (Expanding Unidirectional Ring Of Pages) at Imperial College in 1994. The idea developed further when Giraldo Hierro conceptualized a central CGI (Common Gateway Interface) script to enhance functionality. Sage Weil developed such a script in May 1994. Weil's script gained popularity, pushing Weil in June 1995 to form a company called WebRing. In 1997, Weil sold WebRing to Starseed, Inc.

In 1998, Starseed was acquired by GeoCities, which made no major changes to the system. Just a few months later, in early 1999, Yahoo! bought GeoCities, and eighteen months after the acquisition, on September 5, 2000, Yahoo! unveiled a fully overhauled WebRing, known as Yahoo! WebRing. Although Yahoo!'s implementation was meant to streamline the way the rings were managed and provide a more consistent interface for all rings, many of these changes were unpopular with ringmasters accustomed to the older system which gave them more flexibility.

On April 15, 2001, Yahoo! ended its support of WebRing, leaving the site in the hands of one technician from the original WebRing, Timothy Killeen. On October 12, 2001, he unveiled a WebRing no longer affiliated with Yahoo!. In the years since that change, many of the features which had been stripped by Yahoo!, particularly customization options, were re-implemented into the WebRing system.

On September 26, 2006, WebRing Inc. announced a new WebRing Premium Membership Program. Memberships were separated into two types, WebRing 1.0 and WebRing 2.0. Sites that were part of WebRing 1.0 would be limited to 50 webrings per URL. Existing 1.0 members could maintain more than 50, but can not add more. In conjunction with the premium membership program, WebRing introduced an affiliate program, in which webmasters earned money when others join webrings from their site, and they earned an additional payment if the new member purchases a premium membership.

In early October 2007, the US Trademark office granted WebRing a trademark on its name. Also in that month, Yahoo!'s long partnership ended, when WebRing ownership repurchased WebRing stock held by Yahoo!, marking the first time since the late 1990s that WebRing was privately held.

By August 15, 2020, webring.com became inaccessible, and as of December 18, 2021, the domain name has been taken over by a domain squatter.

== Other webring websites ==
An alternative website is Webringo.com, run as a hobby by the RingMaster. The first "webringo" first appeared in the Internet Archive in September 2006, but failed in September 2011. The present RingMaster took it over as a hobby in August 2012, and then went down somewhere in March 2024.

Alt-webring.com used the Ringlink (Free CGI Perl program for running webrings). The first "Alt-webring" first appeared in the Internet Archive in April 2003. Alt-webring.com has since closed and has been taken over by a domain squatter.

RingSurf.com uses the term "Net Rings". The site first appeared in the Internet Archive in June 1998. The site's main page and directory of rings are still operating as of May 2025, but the rings' sites are inaccessible.

== Webring software ==
While the largest webring services use their own proprietary software, a few programs have been written that make it possible for webmasters to run webrings without being dependent on an off-site service. Ringlink, SimpleRing, PHP-Ring, and Ringmaker are some examples.

== See also ==
- Article directory
- Hashtag
- Methods of website linking
- Personal web page
- Web badge
- Web directory
- Web navigation
