= Sage Weil =

Software engineer

- Weil, c. 2012
- Born: March 17, 1978 (age 48)
- Other names: Liewegas
- Occupation: Software engineer
- Employer: Civic Media
- Known for: Ceph

Sage Weil (born March 17, 1978) is the founder and chief architect of Ceph, a distributed storage platform. He also was the creator of WebRing, a co-founder of Los Angeles–based hosting company DreamHost, and the founder and CTO of Inktank. Weil additionally worked for Red Hat as the chief architect of the Ceph project. Weil is currently the CEO of Civic Media, a group owner of radio stations in the Midwest.

Weil earned a Bachelor of Science in computer science from Harvey Mudd College in 2000 and completed his PhD in 2007 at the University of California, Santa Cruz working with Prof. Scott Brandt on consistency protocols, data distribution (CRUSH), and the metadata manager in the Ceph distributed file system. In 2014, he won an O'Reilly Open Source Award.

== WebRing ==
In May 1994, Weil developed a script based on work by Denis Howe and Giraldo Hierro that became the technology behind WebRing. Weil launched WebRing in June 1995 and eventually sold it to Starseed, Inc. in 1997.

== DreamHost ==
As an undergraduate, Weil worked with fellow Harvey Mudd College students Dallas Bethune, Josh Jones, and Michael Rodriguez to build DreamHost. The site was registered and began hosting customers’ sites in 1997. DreamHost incubated and eventually spun off Inktank.

== Inktank ==
In 2011, Weil co-founded Inktank with (CEO) Bryan Bogensberger as the CTO and technical architect. Inktank was a professional services and support company for the open source Ceph file system. The company was initially funded by DreamHost and later supplemented by Mark Shuttleworth. On 30 April 2014, it was announced that Red Hat would acquire Inktank Storage for $175 Million.

In May 2015, he donated $3 million to the UC Santa Cruz to support research in open-source software. The Sage Weil Presidential Chair for Open Source Software at the university was also established.

== Publications ==
1. Weil, Sage; Leung, Andrew; Brandt, Scott A.; Maltzahn, Carlos (2007), "RADOS: A Fast, Scalable, and Reliable Storage Service for Petabyte-scale Storage Clusters", Proceedings of the ACM Petascale Data Storage Workshop 2007 (PDSW 07) (pdf)
2. Weil, Sage; Brandt, Scott A.; Miller, Ethan L.; Maltzahn, Carlos (2006), "CRUSH: Controlled, Scalable, Decentralized Placement of Replicated Data", Proceedings of SC '06 (pdf)
3. Weil, Sage; Brandt, Scott A.; Miller, Ethan L.; Maltzahn, Carlos; Long, Darrell D. E. (2006), "Ceph: A Scalable, High-Performance Distributed File System", Proceedings of the 7th Conference on Operating Systems Design and Implementation (OSDI '06) (pdf)
4. Weil, Sage; Wang, Feng; Xin, Qin; Brandt, Scott A.; Miller, Ethen L.; Long, Darrell D. E. (2006), "Ceph: A Scalable Object-Based Storage System", Technical Report UCSC-SSRC-06-01 (pdf)
5. Weil, Sage; Pollack, Kristal; Brandt, Scott A.; Miller, Ethan L. (2004), "Dynamic Metadata Management for Petabyte-Scale File Systems", Proceedings of the 2004 ACM/IEEE Conference on Supercomputing (SC '04) (pdf)
6. Weil, Sage; Brandt, Scott A.; Miller, Ethan L. (2004), "Intelligent Metadata Management for a Petabyte-Scale File System", 2nd Intelligent Storage Workshop (pdf)
