= DreamHost =

Web hosting provider and domain name registrar

- Company type: Private
- Industry: Web hosting service; Cloud computing service; Cloud storage service; Domain name registrar
- Founded: April 10, 1996; 30 years ago Claremont, California, U.S.
- Headquarters: Brea, California, U.S.
- Area served: Worldwide
- Key people: Dallas Bethune, Josh Jones, Michael Rodriguez, Sage Weil, Brett Dunst
- Products: Web and cloud services
- Parent: New Dream Network, LLC
- ASN: 26347
- Website: dreamhost.com

DreamHost is a Los Angeles-based web hosting provider and domain name registrar. It is owned by New Dream Network, LLC, founded in 1996 by Dallas Bethune, Josh Jones, Michael Rodriguez and Sage Weil, undergraduate students at Harvey Mudd College in Claremont, California, and registered in 1997 by Michael Rodriguez. DreamHost began hosting customers' sites in 1997. In May 2012, DreamHost spun off Inktank. Inktank is a professional services and support company for the open source Ceph file system. In November 2014, DreamHost spun off Akanda, an open source network virtualization project. As of February 2016, Dreamhost employs about 200 people and has close to 400,000 customers.

== Web hosting ==
DreamHost's shared, VPS, and dedicated hosting network consists of Apache, nginx and lighttpd web servers running on the Ubuntu operating system. DreamHost also offers cloud storage and computing services for entrepreneurs and developers, launched in 2012. The control panel for users to manage all services is a custom application designed in-house, and includes integrated billing and a support ticket system. DreamHost's staff contributes to an official blog and a customer support wiki.

DreamHost does not offer call-in phone support, but customers can pay extra to request callbacks from support staff. Furthermore, a live chat option is available for all accounts when the level of support emails is low. This option is always available for customers who already pay the monthly fee for callbacks. The company hosts in excess of one million domains.

=== File hosting ===
In 2006, the company began a beta version file hosting service it called "Files Forever". The company stated that existing customers could store files "forever" after paying a one-time storage fee, and redistribute or sell them with DreamHost handling the transactions. As of November 2012, this service was no longer offered to new customers. In April 2013, DreamHost mentioned that the Files Forever service had been discontinued and that it would focus on building a better-supported storage technology.

=== Free application hosting ===
In 2009, the company began offering free web application hosting. With either their own domain or a free subdomain, customers were able to make use of several open source applications, such as WordPress and MediaWiki without charge. The service is similar to, and can be integrated with, the Google App Engine. Through a control panel, customers can manage their applications or upgrade to the standard, fully managed hosting service.

== DreamCompute ==
DreamHost's DreamCompute is a public cloud computing service that provides scalable compute resources for developers and entrepreneurs. DreamCompute users select the amount of compute resources and storage resources needed and define their own virtual networks. DreamCompute is powered by OpenStack and Ceph and is designed for scalability, resiliency, and security.

The DreamCompute dashboard is built with OpenStack's Horizon project. The dashboard provides a user interface for interacting with DreamCompute's three main services: Compute, Networking, and Storage. Functions such as launching an instance, creating storage volumes, and configuring a virtual network, as well as creating and managing snapshots of both a running instance and storage volumes, are done in the dashboard.

DreamCompute leverages OpenStack APIs for system automation.

== DreamObjects ==
DreamHost's DreamObjects is a cloud storage service powered by Ceph. Ceph's distributed object storage system allows for storing DreamObjects’ data on multiple disks across multiple servers for high fault-tolerance. DreamObjects users store any kind of data (developer content, video, music, etc.) and make it accessible from anywhere in the cloud. Because data is redundantly stored across multiple locations, a fault in any part of the redundant system – such as the loss of a server – will go unnoticed by users, as a user's data remains available and accessible. Commonly used by developers needing object storage to augment or replace S3 or Swift functionally via API, DreamObjects will scale to let a user store any capacity of data. DreamObjects costs are usage-based, with no costs upfront.

== DreamPress ==
DreamPress is DreamHost's managed WordPress hosting offering that features WordPress-optimized servers and support for novice and advanced WordPress users. In May 2015, DreamHost released DreamPress 2, featuring the deployment of high-speed Solid State Drives.

In December 2024, DreamHost partnered with BunnyCDN and integrated its CDN into DreamPress, naming it "Essential CDN". This partnership aims to enhance site performance and reliability for DreamPress users, ensuring faster load times and improved user experiences.

== Involvement with OpenStack ==
DreamHost was involved throughout the evolution of OpenStack, contributing developers and engineers to the project beginning in early 2011. DreamHost development team members have been leaders on several major OpenStack projects, and have over 1,200 code commits changing over 128,000 lines of OpenStack code. DreamHost CEO Simon Anderson has been on OpenStack's Board of Directors since the OpenStack Foundation's inception. In January 2015, DreamHost was elected by Gold members of the OpenStack Foundation to represent for a third consecutive year.

== Inktank ==
In May 2012, DreamHost spun off Inktank. Inktank is a professional services and support company for the open-source Ceph storage system. Inktank was acquired by Red Hat in April 2014 for $175 million.

== Akanda ==
In November 2014, DreamHost spun off Akanda, an open source network virtualization project for OpenStack clouds, into a separate company.

== Anti-Trump site warrant ==
On July 12, 2017, the U.S. Department of Justice was granted a federal search warrant ordering DreamHost to hand over IP addresses and other personally identifiable data from visitors to disruptj20.org, a website that helped organize anti-Trump protests on and around Inauguration Day 2017. The Electronic Frontier Foundation said in a blog entry there was "no plausible explanation" for such a warrant and asserted it violates the Fourth Amendment. DreamHost went to court, seeking to narrow the scope of the warrant, and in October 2017, Chief Judge Robert E. Morin, of the District of Columbia Superior Court, did just that, ordering that the DOJ could execute its warrant, but that "it does not have the right to rummage through the information contained on DreamHost's website and discover the identity of, or access communications by, individuals not participating in alleged criminal activity, particularly those who were engaging in protected First Amendment activities."
