= SUSE S.A. =

Open-source software company

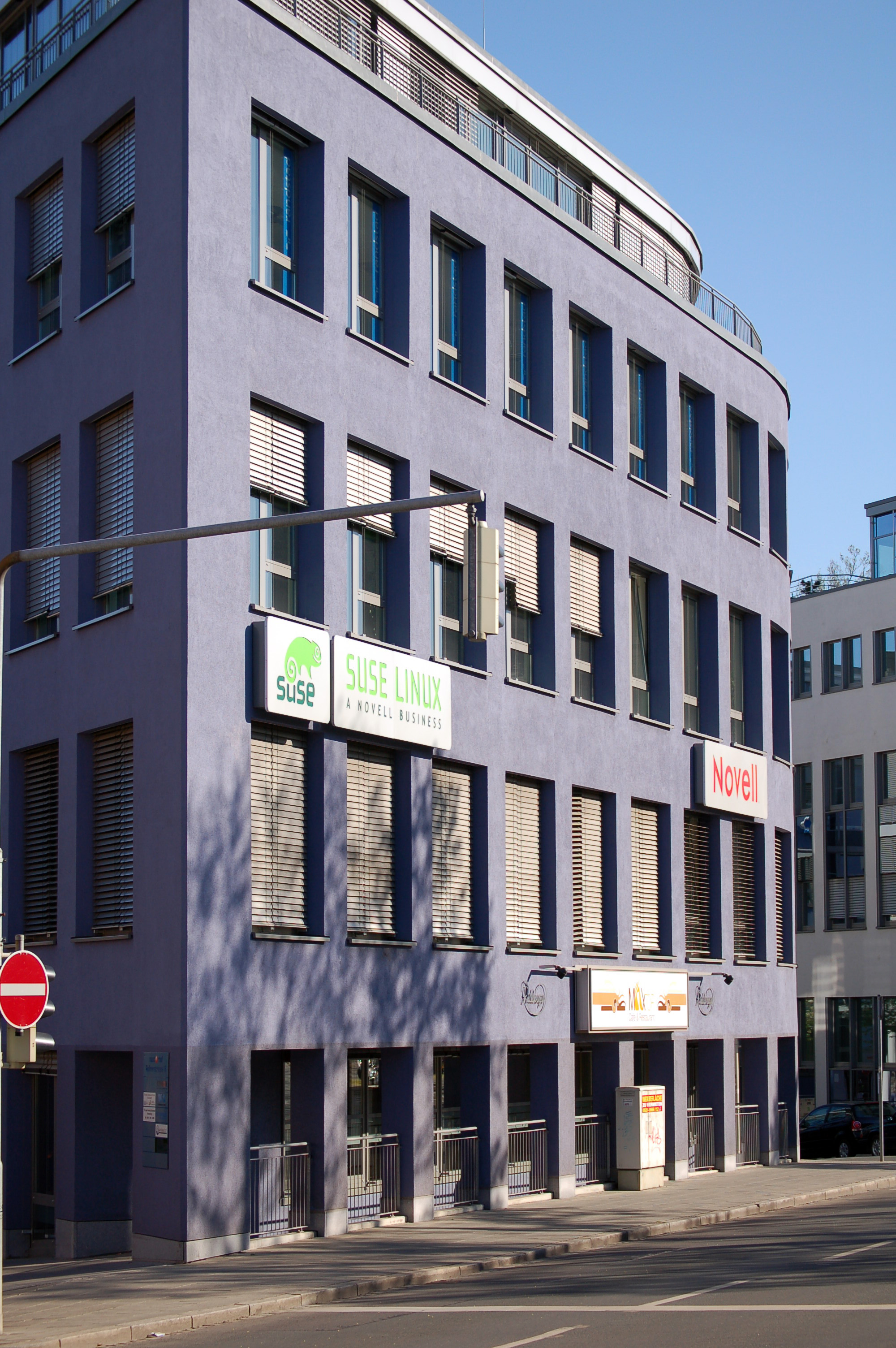
- Former headquarters of SUSE in Nuremberg (2007)
- Trade name: SUSE S.A.
- Type: Privately held (Société Anonyme)
- ISIN: LU2333210958
- Industry: Computer software
- Founded: Fürth, Germany (2 September 1992; 34 years ago)
- Founder: Roland Dyroff; Thomas Fehr; Hubert Mantel; Burchard Steinbild
- Headquarters: Luxembourg City (corporate); Nuremberg (operational)
- Area served: Worldwide
- Key people: Dirk-Peter van Leeuwen (CEO)
- Products: SUSE Linux Enterprise; SUSE Linux Micro; SUSE Manager; SUSE Enterprise Storage; SUSE Edge; Rancher Labs; RKE; Longhorn; K3S
- Revenue: US$700 million+ (2022)
- Number of employees: 2,500 (2024)
- Parent: EQT AB
- Website: www.suse.com

SUSE S.A. (/ˈsuːsə, ˈsuːzə/ SOO-sə, SOO-zə, German: [ˈzuːzə]) is a multinational open-source software company that develops and sells Linux products to business customers. Founded in 1992, it was the first company to market Linux for enterprise. It is the developer of SUSE Linux Enterprise and the primary sponsor of the community-supported openSUSE Linux distribution project. SUSE S.A. is headquartered in Luxembourg and operates out of Germany.

The openSUSE "Tumbleweed" variation is an upstream distribution for both the "Leap" variation and SUSE Linux Enterprise distribution. Meanwhile, its branded "Leap" variation is part of a direct upgrade path to the enterprise version, which effectively makes openSUSE Leap a non-commercial version of its enterprise product.

== History ==
=== Early ===
On 2 September 1992 in Nuremberg, Germany, Roland Dyroff, Burchard Steinbild, Hubert Mantel and Thomas Fehr founded the Software and Systems Development Corporation (German: Gesellschaft für Software und Systementwicklung mbH). Three of the founders were still mathematics students at a university; Fehr had already graduated and was working as a software engineer. The name S.u.S.E. was an acronym for Software- und System-Entwicklung (Software and Systems Development). The name alludes to the inventor of the modern computer, Konrad Zuse.

The original idea was that the company would develop software and function as an advisory UNIX group. According to Mantel, the group decided to distribute Linux, offering support. The first Linux product sold was an extension of the Linux distribution Slackware, which was delivered on 40 floppy disks. The company translated the distribution in cooperation with the Slackware founder Patrick Volkerding into German. While the core of the distribution remained Slackware, in early 1994, S.u.S.E. released its first own distribution based on the Jurix distribution published by Florian La Roche.

In 1997, S.u.S.E. opened an office in Oakland, California, and in 1998, moved the corporate office from Fürth to Nürnberg. In December 1998, the name was changed from S.u.S.E. to SuSE and restylized to "SUSE" in 2003. In the following years, SUSE opened a total of six national and four international (USA, Czech Republic, Great Britain and Italy) branches. On 25 November 2002, Richard Seibt became CEO. In Hong Kong, SUSE's products are distributed by TriTech Distribution Limited.

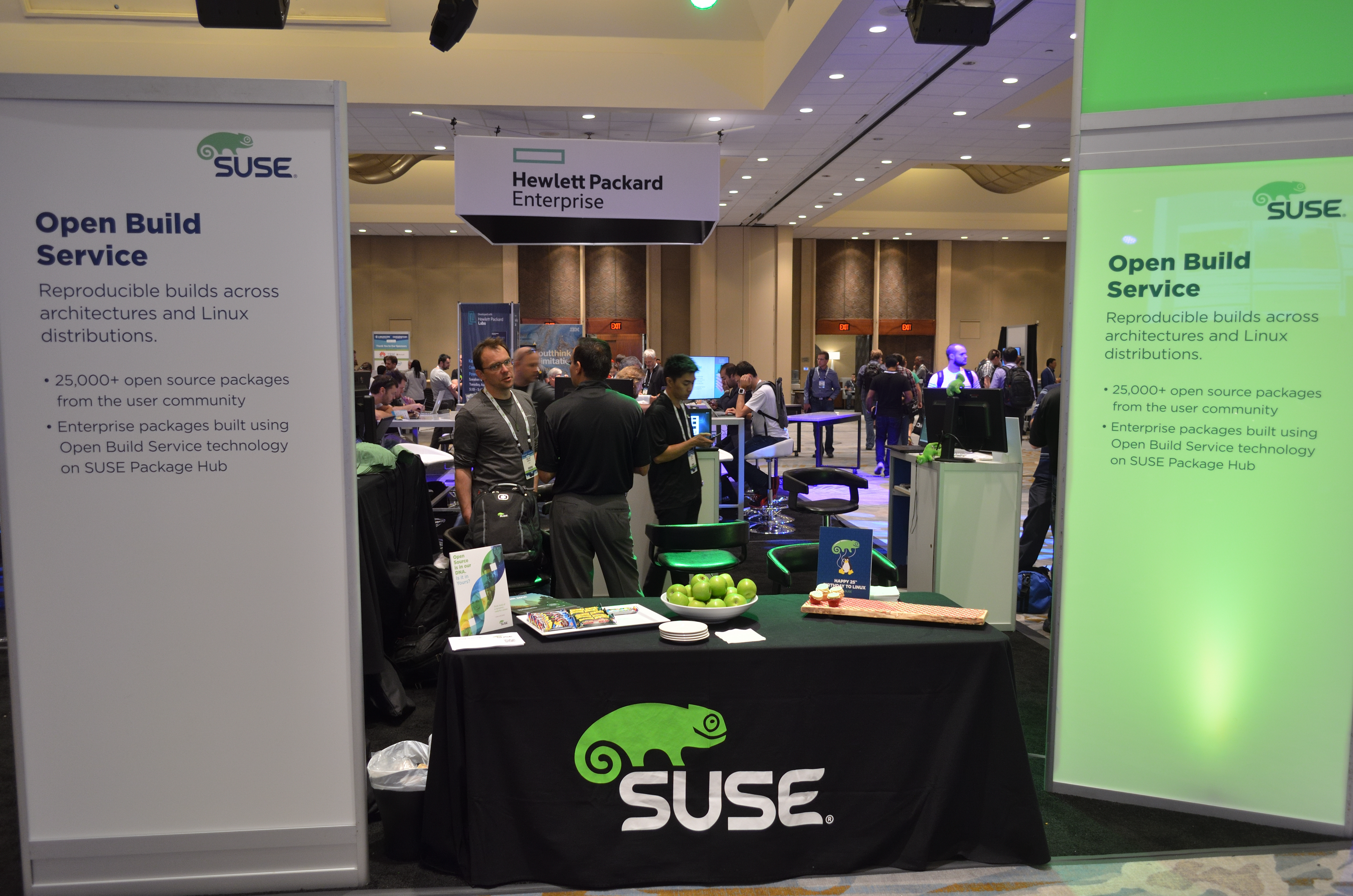
SUSE at Linuxcon

The official logo and current mascot of the distribution is a veiled chameleon officially named GEEKO (a portmanteau of "gecko" and "geek"). As with the company's name, the GEEKO logo has evolved to reflect company name changes.

==== Origins ====
The company started as a service provider, regularly releasing software packages that included Softlanding Linux System (SLS, now defunct) and Slackware and printing UNIX and Linux manuals, and offering technical assistance.

These third-party products SUSE initially used had those characteristics and were managed by SUSE in different fashions:

- In mid-1992, Peter MacDonald created the comprehensive Linux distribution known as SLS, which offered elements such as X and TCP/IP. This was distributed to people who wanted to get Linux via floppy disks.
- In 1993, Patrick Volkerding cleaned up the SLS Linux distribution, releasing a newer version as Slackware.
- In 1994, with help from Patrick Volkerding, Slackware scripts were translated into German, which was marked as the first release of S.u.S.E. Linux 1.0 distribution. It was available first on floppies, and then on CDs.

To build its own Linux distribution, S.u.S.E. used SLS in 1992 and Jurix in 1996 as starting point. This was created by Florian La Roche, who joined the S.u.S.E. team. He began to develop YaST, the installer and configuration tool that would become the central point of the distribution.

In 1996, the first distribution under the name S.u.S.E. Linux was published as S.u.S.E. Linux 4.2, a reference to the answer to "The Ultimate Question of Life, the Universe and Everything" from the Hitchhiker's Guide to the Galaxy. YaST's first version number, 0.42, was a similar reference.

==== Expansion ====
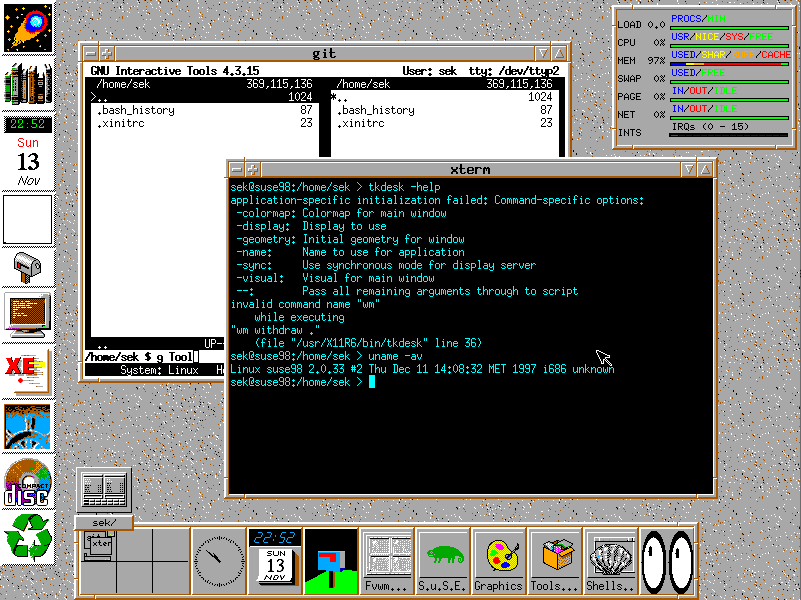
FVWM running on SUSE 5.1

Over time, SuSE Linux incorporated many aspects of Red Hat Linux, such as its RPM Package Manager, its file structure, networks configuration, SysVinit management, among other features.

S.u.S.E. became the largest Linux distributor in Germany. In 1997, SuSE, LLC was established under the direction of president and managing partner James Gray in Oakland, California, which enabled the company to develop Linux markets in the Americas and Asia. While Red Hat was ubiquitous in the United States, SuSE Linux continued to grow in Germany as well as in Nordic countries such as Finland and Sweden. In October 1998, the name was changed officially to SuSE (without dots). Linus Torvalds, the creator of the Linux kernel, used it fairly often. SuSE entered the UK in 1999.

In 2000 SuSE released "SuSE Linux Enterprise Server for S/390" becoming the first Enterprise Oriented Linux distribution.

In 2001 SuSE released "SUSE Linux Enterprise Server 7" be available for AMD's and Intel's 32-bit architecture (x86), Intel's 64-bit architecture (Itanium processor family), and IBM's mainframe platform S/390 as well as iSeries, pSeries, and zSeries.

=== Novell ===
On 4 November 2003, Novell announced it would acquire SuSE Linux AG for $210 million. Novell had been migrating away from the NetWare kernel and used this acquisition as a migration path for its customers. The acquisition was finalized in January 2004 and the name was changed from SuSE Linux AG to a Novell, Inc. subsidiary under the name SuSE Linux GmbH and SUSE Linux Products GmbH. SUSE Linux Products GmbH was entirely responsible for the development of the SUSE Linux distribution and was led by Markus Rex. During the transfer, both the partner and the sales organizations were integrated into Novell. Richard Seibt became CEO of Novell EMEA and left on 9 May 2005.

In a move to reach its business audience more effectively, SuSE introduced the SUSE Linux Enterprise Server in 2001, and a few months before Novell's purchase, changed the company name to "SUSE Linux". "SUSE" is now a name, not an acronym.

According to J. Philips, Novell's corporate technology strategist for the Asia Pacific region, Novell would not "in the medium term" alter the way in which SUSE was developed. At Novell's annual BrainShare conference in 2004, for the first time, all of their computers were run with SUSE Linux and it was announced that the proprietary SUSE administration program YaST2 would be released under the GPL license.

==== The openSUSE Project ====
On 4 August 2005, Novell announced that the SUSE Professional series would become more open, with the launch of the openSUSE Project community. The software always had been open source, but openSUSE opened the development process, allowing developers and users to test and develop it. Previously, all development work had been accomplished in-house by SUSE. Version 10.0 was the first version that offered public beta testing.

SUSE Linux 10.0 included both open source and proprietary applications and retail boxed-set editions. As part of the change, YaST Online Update server access became free for all SUSE Linux users, and also for the first time, the GNOME desktop was upgraded to equal status with the traditional KDE.

In November 2005, SUSE founder Hubert Mantel announced his resignation from the company. He stated that Novell's acquisition had changed SUSE beyond his expectations and that he did not believe it was the same company that he had founded 13 years earlier. The resignation apparently stemmed from a dispute over the implementation of Ximian products in the GNOME-based default desktop environment for the Linux distribution. He re-joined only a year later.

==== Microsoft agreement ====
On 3 November 2006 (renewed 25 July 2011), Novell signed an agreement with Microsoft covering improvement of SUSE's ability to interoperate with Microsoft Windows, cross-promotion/marketing of both products and patent cross-licensing. The agreement is considered controversial by some in the Free Software community.

=== The Attachmate Group takeover ===
On 22 November 2010, Novell announced that it had agreed to acquisition by The Attachmate Group for $2.2 billion. The Attachmate Group planned to operate Novell as two units with SUSE becoming a stand-alone business, and it anticipated no change to the relationship between the SUSE business and the openSUSE project as a result of this transaction.

The U.S. Department of Justice announced that in order to proceed with the first phase of their acquisition of certain patents and patent applications from Novell Inc., CPTN Holdings LLC and its owners would have to alter their original agreements to address the department's antitrust concerns. The department said that, as originally proposed, the deal would jeopardize the ability of open source software, such as Linux, to continue to innovate and compete in the development and distribution of server, desktop, and mobile operating systems as well as middleware and virtualization products.

Stipulations regarding the licensing the patents were:

- All of the Novell patents will be acquired subject to the GNU General Public License, Version 2, a widely adopted open-source license, and the Open Invention Network (OIN) License, a significant license for the Linux System;
- CPTN does not have the right to limit which of the patents, if any, are available under the OIN license; and
- Neither CPTN nor its owners will make any statement or take any action with the purpose of influencing or encouraging either Novell or Attachmate to modify which of the patents are available under the OIN license.

The acquisition was completed on 27 April 2011. Subsequently, on 23 July 2011 The Attachmate Group launched a new website for the SUSE business. Under its new owner, SUSE remained a separate company. By June 2012, many former SUSE engineers who had been laid off during Novell's ownership had been brought back.

=== Micro Focus merger ===
On 20 November 2014, the Attachmate Group merged with Micro Focus to form the Micro Focus Group, making Micro Focus International SUSE's new parent company. SUSE is operated as a separate business unit with a dedicated product portfolio. Former president Nils Brauckmann was promoted to CEO and member of the Micro Focus Group board.

=== Acquisition of OpenAttic ===
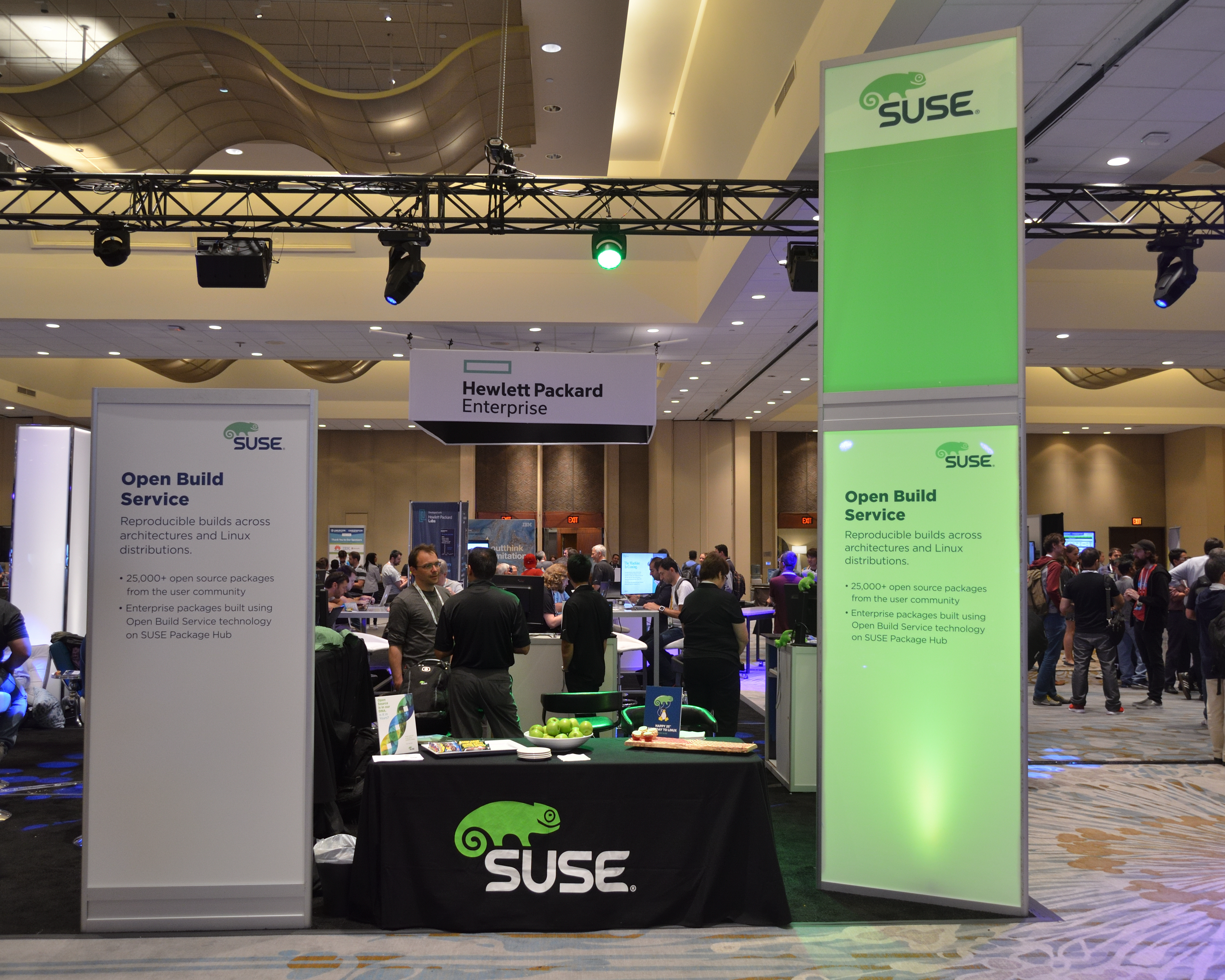
SUSE at Linuxcon 2016

On 9 November 2016, SUSE announced the acquisition of assets relating to the OpenAttic storage management assets from the German IT firm it-novum. OpenAttic was integrated into SUSE Enterprise Storage as a graphical tool to manage and monitor Ceph-based storage clusters.

=== Acquisition of HPE OpenStack and Stackato ===
On 9 March 2017, SUSE announced the completion of its acquisition of assets relating to the OpenStack and Cloud Foundry products from Hewlett Packard Enterprise (HPE). Development teams and code related to those products were to be used to expand SUSE's IaaS and PaaS capabilities. As part of the agreement, HPE was given the option to OEM those products to produce their Helion OpenStack and Stackato products.

=== Sale to EQT AB ===
On 2 July 2018, it was announced that Micro Focus would sell its SUSE business segment to Blitz 18-679 GmbH, a newly-created subsidiary of EQT AB, for $2.535 billion. On 15 March 2019, SUSE announced the completion of the acquisition. Blitz 18-679 GmbH later adopted the name Marcel BidCo GmbH and is currently an ultimate parent of SUSE Software Solutions Germany GmbH, which continued operations of SUSE LINUX GmbH, a company dissolved on 28 August 2019.

On 22 July 2019, Melissa Di Donato, former SAP COO, was appointed CEO of SUSE.

=== Acquisition of Rancher Labs ===
On 8 July 2020, SUSE announced its definitive agreement to acquire Rancher Labs, which provides a Kubernetes management platform. The acquisition closed on 1 December 2020, at which time Rancher CEO and cofounder Sheng Liang became SUSE's President of Engineering and Innovation.

=== Initial public offering ===
Early in 2021 sources indicated that SUSE was preparing for an IPO before summer with a projected value of 7-8 billion euros. An official ITF (Intent to Float) statement was then released on 26 April 2021. On 19 May 2021, SUSE went public at Frankfurt Stock Exchange at an original issue price of 30 euros, with EQT AB retaining 75.7 percent. The headquarters of the newly formed SUSE S.A. was set to Luxembourg. Nürnberg remained the largest software development office though.

=== Acquisition of NeuVector ===
On 28 October 2021, SUSE announced that it had acquired NeuVector, Inc., a provider of full lifecycle container security, for $130 million in cash and stock.

=== Delisting from the Frankfurt Stock Exchange ===
On 21 March 2023, SUSE appointed Dirk-Peter van Leeuwen as new CEO. After facing a downward trends in sales and a sharp decline in its share price, on 13 November 2023 an extraordinary general meeting approved the delisting from Frankfurt Stock Exchange.

=== Acquisition of Losant ===
On 19 February 2026, SUSE announced that it had acquired Losant, an Industrial Internet of Things (IIoT) platform.

== Products ==
The initial public release of SUSE Linux Enterprise Server was version 7 published on 24 August 2001. Starting with the launch of the SUSE Linux Enterprise 10 platform in July 2006, the SUSE Linux Enterprise 10 platform was the basis for both the server and desktop, with an almost identical code base. As of 2026, SUSE Linux Enterprise 16 is the latest available version.

=== Linux ===
==== SUSE Linux Enterprise Server ====
The primary Linux distribution from SUSE is SUSE Linux Enterprise Server ("SLES") targeted to large organizations for physical, virtual and cloud workloads. This offering is part of the SUSE Linux Enterprise family of products. All versions are available for multiple processor architectures, including Intel x86, ARM, AMD x86-64, IBM Power, and IBM S/390 and z Systems,. SLES is available in both on-demand and bring-your-own-subscription ("BYOS") images on Amazon EC2, Microsoft Azure, and Google Compute Engine.

===== Server offerings from the SUSE Linux Enterprise family of products =====
- SUSE Linux Enterprise Server for SAP Applications, a Linux operating system optimized for SAP workloads
- SUSE Linux Enterprise Point of Service, a Linux operating system for the retail industry that includes a version of Linux tailored for user touch points and in-store servers
- SUSE Linux Enterprise High Performance Computing, a Linux operating system for high performance computing
- SUSE Linux Enterprise High Availability Extension, an integrated suite of open source HA clustering and storage replication technologies

===== Special editions of the Server product =====
SUSE Linux Enterprise Server has several optimized editions created in the context of the respective partnerships. These editions are derived from the base Server product:

- SLES for Amazon EC2
- SLES for Microsoft Azure, which includes a specially tuned kernel
- SLES for ARM Raspberry Pi support, a specially packaged version of SUSE Linux Enterprise Server for ARM, tailored for Raspberry Pi 3 Model B
- SUSE Linux Enterprise Real Time, a special version of SUSE Linux Enterprise Server that turns the general-purpose operating system into a real-time operating system

==== Desktop offerings from the SUSE Linux Enterprise family of products ====
- SUSE Linux Enterprise Desktop, the successor to Novell Linux Desktop
- SUSE Linux Enterprise Workstation Extension, an add-on extension that adds desktop features to the SUSE Linux Enterprise Server

==== Deprecated versions ====
- SLES for VMware (entitlement was included in VMware vSphere; product end-of-availability announced on 25 June 2014)

=== Software-defined infrastructure ===
- SUSE OpenStack Cloud, an automated cloud computing platform based on OpenStack for deploying and managing IaaS private clouds. SUSE announced that they would discontinue sales as of October 2019
- SUSE Enterprise Storage, a software-defined storage tool based on Ceph enabling the use of commodity servers and disk drives for cost-effective, resilient, and scalable storage. SUSE announced they would discontinue sales as of March 2021

=== Management ===
- SUSE Multi-Linux Manager, a comprehensive Linux server management tool based on Uyuni (a fork of Spacewalk, based on SaltStack) for package and patch management, system provisioning and monitoring

=== Application delivery ===
- SUSE CaaS Platform ("Container as a Service"), an application development and hosting platform for container-based applications and services based on Kubernetes
- SUSE Cloud Application Platform, a PaaS environment based on Cloud Foundry and Kubernetes

=== SUSE Studio ===
SUSE Studio product was a web interface (built using Ruby on Rails) to openSUSE's KIWI and the Open Build Service tools. It allowed users to put together a custom Linux distribution graphically and to generate output including a large variety of Virtual Machine and Disk Images. SUSE Studio merged with Open Build Service and the resulting project was renamed to SUSE Studio Express in September 2017.

== Projects ==
=== openSUSE ===
openSUSE is driven by the openSUSE Project community and sponsored by SUSE, to develop and maintain SUSE Linux components. It was the equivalent of the historic "SuSE Linux Professional". After their acquisition of SUSE Linux, Novell (now SUSE) decided to make the community central to their development process.

=== Uyuni ===
- Uyuni is a comprehensive and integrated Linux server management tool (forked from Spacewalk project, based on SaltStack) for package and patch management, security auditing, system provisioning and monitoring.

== See also ==
- Linux on IBM Z
- List of Linux distributions
- Comparison of Linux distributions
- SUSE Studio
- Novell UnixWare
- Novell Corsair
- Novell Exposé
- Caldera OpenLinux and Caldera Network Desktop
- List of computing mascots
