= Weiqing Gu =

Chinese-American mathematician

Weiqing Gu is a Chinese-American mathematician who works as the Avery Professor of Mathematics and director of the mathematics clinic at Harvey Mudd College. Her research concerns differential geometry and Grassmann manifolds. She has also worked with Harvey Mudd colleague Lisette de Pillis on the mathematical modeling of cancer.

Gu began teaching mathematics at Shanghai Teachers University in 1980, earned a bachelor's degree there in 1984, and continued teaching there until 1987. She began her graduate studies in mathematics at the University of Oklahoma in 1988, but moved the following year to the University of Pennsylvania, completing her Ph.D. in 1995 under the supervision of Herman R. Gluck, a topologist who had been a student of Ralph Fox. In 1996, she added a master's degree in computer science, also from the University of Pennsylvania, after which she joined the faculty at Harvey Mudd.
