= Olivia Prosper Feldman =

American mathematical biologist

Olivia F. Prosper Feldman (published as Olivia Prosper) is a French-born American mathematical biologist, applied mathematician, and epidemiologist, whose research involves mathematically modeling the spread and dynamic behavior of infectious diseases. She is an associate professor of mathematics at the University of Tennessee.

== Education and career ==
Feldman was a student of mathematics at the University of Florida, where she received a bachelor's degree in 2006, a master's degree in 2008, and her Ph.D. in 2012. Her dissertation, Modeling heterogeneities in malaria, was advised by Maia Martcheva and co-advised by David L. Smith.

She worked as an instructor at Dartmouth College from 2012 to 2015, and as an assistant professor at the University of Kentucky from 2015 to 2019, before moving to her present position at the University of Tennessee in 2019. She was promoted to associate professor in 2022.

== Recognition ==
Feldman received a 2021 National Science Foundation CAREER Award, and the 2021 Excellence in Research Prize of the Intercollegiate Biomathematics Alliance. She was chosen by the Association for Women in Mathematics and Mathematical Association of America as the 2025 AWM/MAA Falconer Lecturer.

== Personal life ==
Feldman is of mixed Dominican and French descent: her father, Harrison Prosper, a native of Dominica, moved to England as a child, and "through a series of unlikely events" met and married her mother, Marie-France Prosper-Chartier, from the French village of Plesder in Brittany. Feldman herself was born in Échirolles in southeastern France. Both her parents earned doctorates, and the family emigrated to the United States in 1986, when she was two. She grew up near Fermilab in Illinois, where her father worked before moving to Florida State University in 1993. Her mother also became a professor at Florida State, in the Department of Modern Languages.

She is married to Matthew Feldman, a physicist at Oak Ridge National Laboratory; they have two sons.
