= Inktank Storage =

Data sorage company

Inktank Storage Inc.
- Type: Subsidiary of Red Hat; Private company
- Industry: Computer storage
- Founded: 2011; 15 years ago
- Headquarters: Los Angeles, California
- Key people: Sage Weil (Founder & CTO); Bryan Bogensberger (Founder & CEO)
- Website: inktank.com at the Wayback Machine (archived 2013-03-27)

Inktank Storage was the lead development contributor and financial sponsor company behind the open source Ceph distributed file system. Inktank was founded by Sage Weil and Bryan Bogensberger and initially funded by DreamHost, Citrix and Mark Shuttleworth.

Red Hat acquired Inktank Storage for $175 Million in April 2014.

== History ==
Inktank was created to offer professional services and support for the open source Ceph storage system. CTO and founder Sage Weil started the open source Ceph project in 2004 for his doctoral dissertation at the University of California, Santa Cruz. In August 2012, Inktank joined the Linux Foundation to further open source technologies such as Ceph. In September 2012, Mark Shuttleworth invested 1 million dollars to help support the progression of Ceph.

== Coverage ==
In July 2012, Inktank was listed in the Infostor 6 Storage Startups to Watch and was listed in CRN The 10 Coolest Storage Startups of 2012. In May 2012, Inktank was listed in CRN 10 Hot Emerging Vendors.
