= Prosper =

Prosper may refer to:

== Places in the United States ==
- Prosper, Michigan, an unincorporated community
- Prosper, Minnesota, an unincorporated community
- Prosper, North Dakota, an unincorporated community
- Prosper, Oregon, an unincorporated community
- Prosper, Texas, a town

== People ==
- Prosper (name), a list of people and fictional characters with the name

== Other uses ==
- Prosper, the code name of Francis Suttill, World War II British secret agent in France
- PROSPER, a computer programming language invented by Earl Isaac in the early 1970s
- Prosper (TV series), a 2024 Australian TV series
- Prosper Marketplace, a business that allows online person-to-person lending and borrowing
- Prosper UK, a British Conservative Party political movement

== See also ==
- Prosperity, a state of overall flourishing and good fortune
- Prospero, a character in Shakespeare's play The Tempest
