= Robert L. Smith (academic) =

American engineer and author

- Occupations: Engineer, academic and author
- Awards: INFORMS Fellow; Altarum/ERIM Russell D. O'Neal Endowed Professorship in Engineering

Academic background
- Education: Harvey Mudd College; University of California, Berkeley

Academic work
- Institutions: University of Michigan, Ann Arbor

Robert L. Smith is an American engineer, academic and author. He is the Altarum/ERIM Russell D. O’Neal professor Emeritus in the Department of Industrial and Operations Engineering at the University of Michigan, Ann Arbor.

Smith's research focuses on the modeling, analysis, and optimization of dynamic systems over time. His main research contributions have been in areas of global optimization, infinite horizon optimization, and intelligent transportation systems. He has published over 100 papers in peer-reviewed journals and has advised 28 PhD students

== Education ==
Smith earned his bachelor's in physics from Harvey Mudd College in 1966. He then completed his master's in business administration in 1968 under the supervision of Reinhard Selten and master's in engineering sciences in 1971 from the University of California, Berkeley, where he also earned a PhD in 1971 under Stuart Dreyfus.

== Academic career ==
Smith started his academic career in 1971 as a lecturer at the Graduate School of Business Administration, University of California, Berkeley and worked there until 1972. From 1972 to 1976 he was a member of the technical staff of Bell Labs, where he worked in network facilities planning. In 1976, he joined the Graduate School of Business and Department of Mathematics and Statistics, University of Pittsburgh, as an assistant professor and served until 1980. He was then appointed as an associate professor and later professor at the Department of Industrial and Operations Engineering, The University of Michigan, Ann Arbor, where he served from 1980 to 2012. In 2003 he was awarded the first Altarum/ERIM Russell D. O’Neal Professorship of Engineering. As of 2012, he is serving as Altarum/ERIM Russell D. O’Neal Professor Emeritus at the University of Michigan.

Smith was director of the Dynamic Systems Optimization Laboratory at the University of Michigan for twenty years. From October 2008 to September 2010, he served as program director for operations research at the National Science Foundation.

== Research ==
Smith has worked in a range of research areas in operations research. He is best known for introducing the hit-and-run algorithm in 1979 for efficiently sampling points from high-dimensional regions which Laszlo Lovasz showed achieved the best performance of all sampling algorithms. Smith and his colleagues introduced Sampled Fictitious Play (SFP) in 2000 for efficiently finding a Nash equilibrium through best replies to draws of other players from historical plays in a series of games of identical interest. Thomas J. Sargent discussed the implications of SFP and other approaches to finding Nash equilibria for artificial Intelligence in sources of artificial intelligence. A Nash equilibrium can be viewed as a local optimum of an optimization problem seen as an identical interest game.

== Awards and recognition ==
Smith received the Michigan Student Assembly's Outstanding Teacher Award (1989), the College of Engineering's Research Excellence Award (1999–2000), the university's Distinguished Faculty Achievement Award (2002–03), and the Department of Industrial and Operations Engineering's Award for Outstanding Accomplishments (2004–05). In 2003 he was elected a Fellow of the Institute for Operations Research and the Management Sciences and was cited for "having produced influential research in a variety of areas including infinite horizon optimization, capacity expansion, foundations of dynamic programming, and the modeling of large-scale distribution and transportation systems."

- 1997 – Research Excellence Award, Department of Industrial and Operations Engineering
- 2002 – Distinguished Faculty Achievement Award, University of Michigan
- 2003 – Altarum/ERIM Russell D. O’Neal Endowed Professorship in Engineering, University of Michigan
- 2003 – Elected Fellow, Institute for Operations Research and the Management Sciences

== Published works ==
=== Selected articles ===
- Smith, Robert L. (1984). "Efficient Monte Carlo procedures for generating points uniformly distributed over bounded regions". Operations Research. 32 (6): 1296–1308. doi:10.1287/opre.32.6.1296. hdl:2027.42/7681.
- Bean, James C.; Smith, Robert L. (1984). "Conditions for the existence of planning horizons". Mathematics of Operations Research. 9 (3): 391–401. doi:10.1287/moor.9.3.391.
- Zabinsky, Zelda B.; Smith, Robert L. (1992). "Pure adaptive search in global optimization". Mathematical Programming. 53 (1–3): 323–338. doi:10.1007/BF01585710. hdl:2027.42/47923.
- Bélisle, Claude J. P.; Romeijn, H. Edwin; Smith, Robert L. (1993). "Hit-and-run algorithms for generating multivariate distributions". Mathematics of Operations Research. 18 (2): 255–266. doi:10.1287/moor.18.2.255. hdl:2027.42/3513.
- Lambert, Theodore J.; Epelman, Marina A.; Smith, Robert L. (2005). "A fictitious play approach to large-scale optimization". Operations Research. 53 (3): 477–489. doi:10.1287/opre.1040.0178.
