= Harrison Prosper =

British-American particle physicist

- Born: Soufrière, Dominica
- Education: University of Manchester (PhD)
- Known for: Compact Muon Solenoid at CERN; Bayesian methods in particle physics
- Awards: Fellow of the American Physical Society; Robert O. Lawton Distinguished Professor; Kirby W. Kemper Endowed Professor of Physics
- Scientific career
- Fields: Particle physics
- Workplaces: Florida State University

Harrison Bertrand Prosper is a Dominican-born British-American particle physicist and the Kirby W. Kemper Endowed Professor of Physics at Florida State University (FSU). He is known for his contributions to experimental particle physics, particularly through his work with the Compact Muon Solenoid experiment at CERN's Large Hadron Collider (LHC). Prosper is also recognised for advancing the use of Bayesian statistical methods in high-energy physics and for promoting diversity in the sciences.

== Early life and education ==
Prosper was born in Soufrière, Dominica and later moved to the United Kingdom. He earned his Ph.D. in physics from the University of Manchester, where he specialised in experimental particle physics.

== Career ==
After completing his Ph.D. in physics at the University of Manchester, Prosper held research positions in the UK and the US before joining FSU in 1993. At FSU, he became involved in the CMS experiment at CERN's Large Hadron Collider (LHC), contributing to searches for supersymmetry, dark matter, and precision studies of the Higgs boson. He has also advanced the use of Bayesian inference and modern machine learning techniques in high-energy physics analysis. Prosper's research spans particle collisions, rare event detection, and advanced statistical methods, and he has co-authored over 1,000 publications as part of CMS.

== Advocacy ==
Prosper is active in promoting diversity and equity in science, having spoken at conferences about the need to support underrepresented minorities in physics. He has also mentored students from diverse backgrounds and contributed to outreach programmes in the United States and the Caribbean, including serving as a recurring mentor in the Google Summer of Code programme.

== Awards ==
- Named Fellow of the American Physical Society (APS) for contributions to high-energy physics.
- Appointed Kirby W. Kemper Endowed Professor of Physics at Florida State University.
- Named Robert O. Lawton Distinguished Professor, the highest faculty honour at Florida State University.

== Personal life ==
Prosper met his wife, Marie-France Prosper-Chartier, a French woman, through a stint at an English middle school. She became a professor of modern languages at Florida State University. They have a daughter, mathematical biologist Olivia Prosper Feldman.
