= Rancher Labs =

American software company

- Type: Private
- Industry: Software
- Founded: 2014; 12 years ago
- Founder: Sheng Liang; Shannon Williams; Darren Shepherd; Will Chan
- Headquarters: Cupertino, California, United States
- Key people: Sheng Liang (CEO); Shannon Williams (President); Darren Shepherd (CTO); Will Chan (CPO)
- Products: Rancher, RancherOS
- Parent: SUSE S.A.
- Website: www.rancher.com

Rancher Labs is an open source software company based in Cupertino, California. The company helps manage Kubernetes at scale. Rancher Labs was founded in 2014 and, according to the company, its flagship product is used by more than 30,000 active teams.

Rancher Labs was funded with $10 million in 2015, $20 million in 2016, and $40 million in 2020. Executives included co-founders Sheng Liang (CEO), Shannon Williams, Darren Shepherd, and Will Chan. The company's headquarters are in Cupertino, California.

In May 2020, Rancher Labs launched Rancher Academy, a free training program through which IT professionals can be certified on a range of technologies the company provides on top of various distributions of Kubernetes. Company President Shannon Williams says Rancher Labs is trying to democratize access to Kubernetes training at a time when many IT organizations still can’t find IT staff with appropriate skills, even in the wake of the economic downturn brought on by the COVID-19 pandemic. A recently released Dice 2020 Tech Job Report found there has been an 82% increase in job demand for individuals with Kubernetes skills over the past year alone. Dice predicts that the demand for Kubernetes skills will enjoy a projected growth rate of more than 67% over the next 10 years.

In April 2020, Rancher Labs released an update to its Kubernetes management platform that makes it easier to upgrade without any downtime in addition to making it easier to remotely access. Company CEO Sheng Liang says that as organizations increasingly operationalize Kubernetes there is now a lot more focus on lifecycle management and scalability. Version 2.4 of Rancher provides access to a set of tools that make it easier for IT teams to manage a fleet of Kubernetes clusters even when network connectivity is limited, says Liang. IT teams can now, for example, initiate an upgrade remotely, but all processes are executed locally. Once completed, the remote cluster synchronizes with the management server once connectivity is re-established.

In July 2020, Rancher Labs announced its definitive agreement to be acquired by SUSE. The deal closed on December 1, 2020.
