= Free On-line Dictionary of Computing =

Online, searchable, encyclopedic dictionary of computing subjects

Free On-line Dictionary of Computing (FOLDOC)

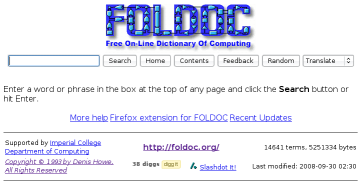
- Website type: Internet encyclopedia project
- Available in: English
- Owner: Denis Howe
- Creators: Denis Howe, many contributors
- Revenue: Yes
- Website: foldoc.org
- IPv6 support: Yes
- Commercial: No
- Registration: None
- Launched: 1985; 41 years ago
- Current status: Active

The Free On-line Dictionary of Computing (FOLDOC) is an online, searchable, encyclopedic dictionary of computing subjects.

== History ==
FOLDOC was founded in 1985 by Denis Howe and was hosted by Imperial College London. In May 2015, the site was updated to state that it was "no longer supported by Imperial College Department of Computing". Howe has served as the editor-in-chief since the dictionary's inception, with visitors to the website able to make suggestions for additions or corrections to articles.

== Open sourcing ==
The dictionary incorporates the text of other free resources, such as the Jargon File, as well as covering many other computing-related topics. Due to its availability under the GNU Free Documentation License, a copyleft license, it has in turn been incorporated in whole or part into other free content projects, such as Wikipedia.

== Recognition ==
- This site's brief 2001 review by a Ziff Davis publication begins: "Despite this online dictionary’s pale user interface, it offers impressive functionality."
- Oxford University Press knows of them, and notes that it "is maintained by volunteers".
- A university tells its students that FOLDOC can be used to find information about "companies, projects, history, in fact any of the vocabulary you might expect to find in a computer dictionary".
