= Lisette de Pillis =

American mathematician

Lisette G. de Pillis is an American mathematician at Harvey Mudd College and holds the Norman F. Sprague, Jr. Professorship of Life Sciences at Harvey Mudd. She chaired the Department of Mathematics in 2008-2009 and again from 2014 to 2019. She directed the Harvey Mudd College Global Clinic program from 2009 to 2014. She is also the co-director of the Harvey Mudd College Center for Quantitative Life Sciences.

== Education ==
De Pillis earned her Ph.D. in 1993 from the University of California, Los Angeles under the supervision of Heinz-Otto Kreiss. Her dissertation was Far Field Behavior of Slightly Compressible Flows.

== Research ==
Her early research concerned computational fluid dynamics. In around 2000, she became interested in cancer immunology, and began doing research on population models and cellular automata models featuring cells of three types: normal cells, cancer cells, and immune cells. By augmenting the model to include cancer treatments and applying control theory, she was able to devise techniques that could lead to more effective personalized treatments for cancer. Her continuing research has produced mathematical models of newly developing immunotherapies, combination therapies, and the emergence of autoimmune diseases.

== Recognition ==
The Argonne National Laboratory named her their Maria Goeppert-Mayer Argonne Distinguished Scholar for 1999–2000. In 2016 she was elected as a fellow of the American Mathematical Society. In 2017 she was a HERS-CBL Clare Boothe Luce Leadership in STEM Scholar. In 2019 she was awarded the MAA Southern California-Nevada Section Award for Distinguished College or University Teaching of Mathematics. In 2020 she was made the Intercollegiate Biomathematics Alliance Distinguished Fellow.

== Textbook ==
- Steven J. Leon and Lisette de Pillis, Linear Algebra with Applications, Tenth Edition, Pearson Education, Inc., ISBN 978-0-13-518163-8, 2020.

== Sample research publications ==
- K. Mahasa, L.G. de Pillis, R. Ouifki, A. Eladdadi, P. Maini, A.-R. Yoon, C.-O. Yun, Mesenchymal Stem Cells Used as Carrier Cells of Oncolytic Adenovirus Results in Enhanced Oncolytic Virotherapy, Nature Sci Rep 10, 425 (2020).
- L.G. de Pillis, with B. Shtylla, M. Gee, A. Do, S. Shabahang, and L. Eldevik, A Mathematical Model for DC Vaccine Treatment of Type I Diabetes, Frontiers in Physiology, Volume 10, 2019, article 1107.
- L.G. de Pillis, Erica J. Graham, Kaitlyn Hood, Yanping Ma, Ami Radunskaya, and Julie Simons, Injury-Initiated Clot Formation Under Flow: A Mathematical Model with Warfarin Treatment, IMA Volumes in Mathematics and its Applications, Volume 158, 2015, pp. 75–98.
- L.G. de Pillis, with E. Schwartz, O.O. Yang, W.G. Cumberland, Computational Model of HIV1 Escape from the Cytotoxic T Lymphocyte Response, Canadian Applied Mathematics Quarterly (CAMQ), Volume 21, Number 2, 2015, pp. 261–279.
- L.G. de Pillis, A. Eladdadi, A.E. Radunskaya, Modeling Cancer-Immune Responses to Therapy, Journal of Pharmacokinetics and Pharmacodynamics, Volume 41, Issue 5, October 2014, pp. 461–478.
- L.G. de Pillis, with A.E. Radunskaya and C.L. Wiseman, A Validated Mathematical Model of Cell-Mediated Immune Response to Tumor Growth, Cancer Research, Vol.61, No.17, pp. 7950–7958, September 1, 2005.
