= DigitaOS =

Digita Operating Environment
- Developer: Flashpoint Technology, Inc
- Written in: C
- Working state: Discontinued
- Source model: Closed-source
- Initial release: May 20, 1998; 27 years ago
- Final release: 1.5 / November 18, 1999; 25 years ago
- Marketing target: Digital cameras
- Official website: digitadev.com at the Wayback Machine (archived 2001-08-14)

DigitaOS was a short lived digital camera operating system created by Flashpoint Technology and used on various Kodak, Pentax, Minolta, and HP cameras in the late 1990s.

== History ==
DigitaOS debuted with the Kodak DC220 and DC260 on 20 May 1998; both cameras were equipped with PowerPC 800 processors and USB interfaces. In total, it was released on 11 camera models before it was abandoned in 2001. DigitaOS was notable for its ability to run third-party software, a concept that was not again realized until the release of various Android based digital cameras in the early 2010s.

DigitaOS applications were programmed either as JIT compiled scripts using "Digita Script", which ran on the cameras, or AOT compiled programs written in C using an official SDK. The operating system abstracted away most camera functionality and hardware platform differences, allowing software to be compatible with most DigitaOS cameras. Additionally, DigitaOS handled the GUI presented to the user and basic camera functionality.

DigitaOS was intended to extend the features of the camera. Examples of functions provided by scripts included in-camera image database and document generation, in-camera image editing, and custom logo / watermark and/or date imprinting. Printers with DigitaOS could resize photographs without connecting to a computer. Digita File allowed the user to rename and copy image and system files on the camera, while Digita Presents was able to output a slideshow with audio and transition effects.

Because of its ability to run third-party software, several games were ported to it. The most notable of these being DOOM and MAME.

== Cameras using DigitaOS ==
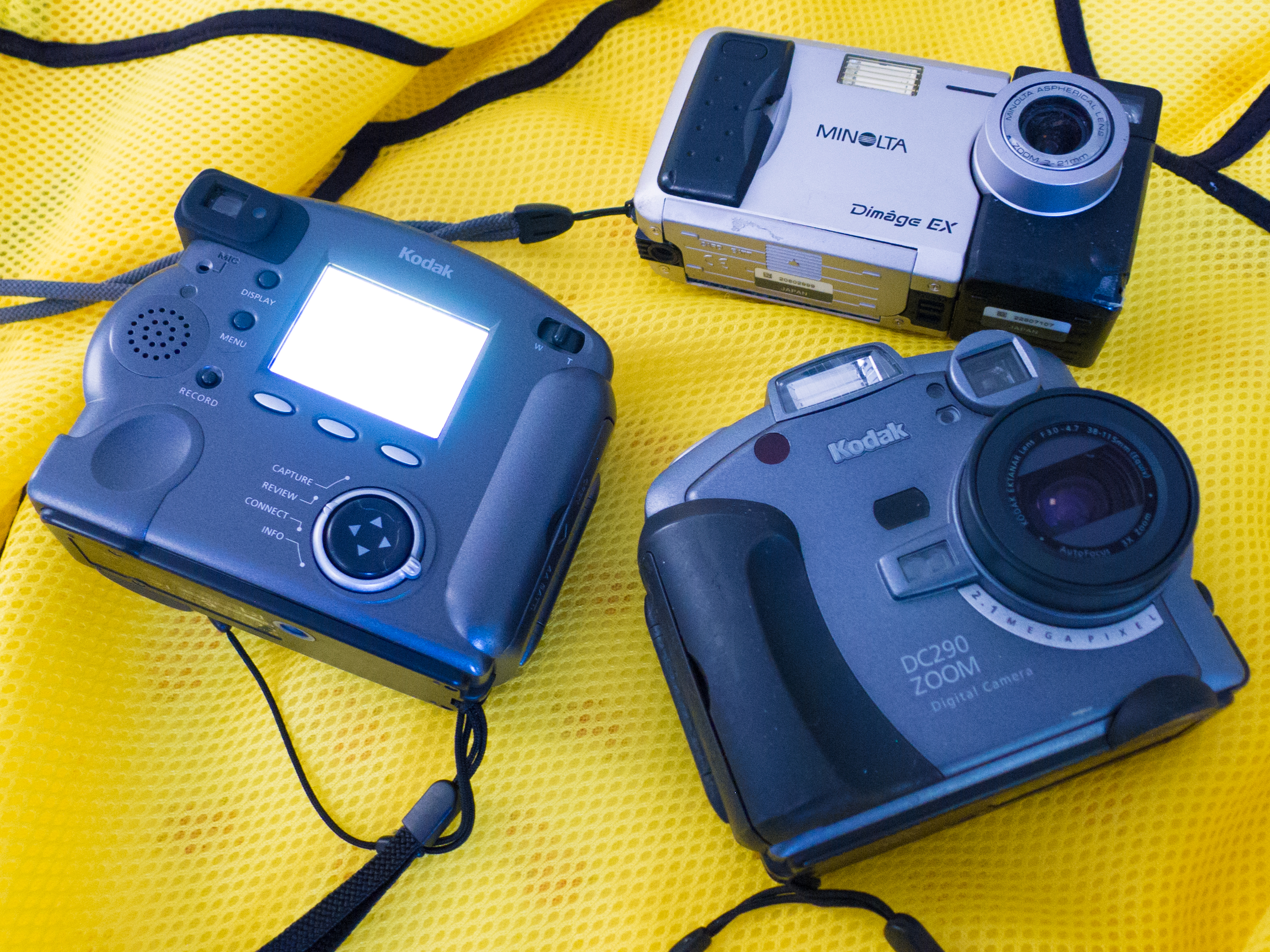
DigitaOS cameras, clockwise from top right: Minolta Dimâge EX, Kodak DC290, Kodak DC265

- Kodak DC220
- Kodak DC260
- Kodak DC265
- Kodak DC290
- Minolta Dimâge EX 1500
- Minolta Dimâge 3D 1500
- HP C500 Photosmart
- HP C618 Photosmart
- HP C912 Photosmart
- PENTAX EI-200
- PENTAX EI-2000
