= Ricoh GXR =

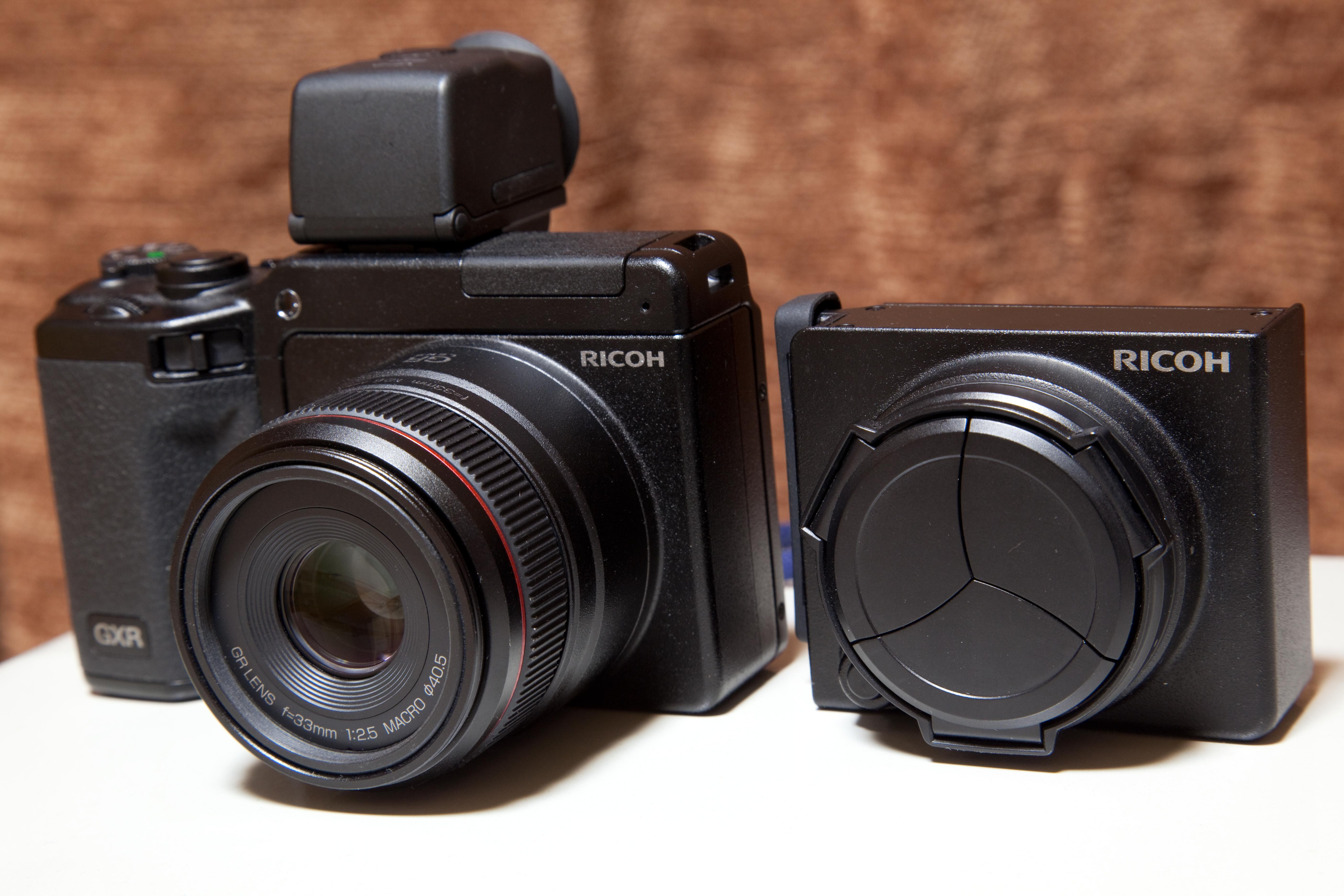
- Ricoh GXR: body with A12 macro lens and VF-2 viewfinder mounted, and S10 24-72 mm equivalent lens on the side

Overview
- Maker: Ricoh
- Type: Interchangeable lens/sensor

Lens
- Lens mount: Ricoh GXR lens/sensor

Sensor/medium
- Sensor type: Varies (CCD in S10; CMOS in P10, A12 and A16 modules)
- Sensor size: Varies (1/2.3" in P10, 1/1.7" in S10, APS-C in A12 and A16)
- Maximum resolution: Varies (10MP in P10 and S10; 12MP in A12; 16MP in A16)
- Recording medium: SD/SDHC

Focusing
- Focus: Automatic

Shutter
- Shutter: leaf (A12, A16, P10, S10) or focal plane (GXR Mount)

Image processing
- Image processor: Varies (GR ENGINE III or Smooth Imaging Engine IV)

General
- LCD screen: 3 inches (7.6 cm); 920,000 pixels
- Battery: Ricoh DB-90 3.6V
- AV port(s): HDMI, USB
- Body features: magnesium alloy
- Dimensions: 113.9 by 70.2 by 37.5 millimetres (4.5 in × 2.8 in × 1.5 in) (body only, excluding projections)
- Weight: 160 g (6 oz) (body only, excluding battery, memory card, strap)

References
- "GXR: Specifications". Ricoh Global. 2016.

The Ricoh GXR is a compact digital camera first announced by Ricoh Company, Ltd, Tokyo on November 10, 2009. Unlike conventional cameras which either have a fixed lens and sensor or interchangeable lens and a fixed sensor, the GXR takes interchangeable units, each housing a lens, sensor and image processing engine, sometimes called a lensor (a portmanteau of lens and sensor).

Following the introduction of the Ricoh GR in 2013, the GXR was discontinued.

== Features ==
The GXR has a modular design, consisting of two major components: the host body, which holds the battery, pop-up flash, rear screen, and external interfaces for data and flash; and a Camera Unit, which holds the image sensor, lens, and image processor in a sealed module. Ricoh also offered a Lens Mount Unit, which omits the bundled lens in favor of a mechanical interface compatible with many Leica M mount lenses.

The body has a hot shoe on top for an external flash unit; the Ricoh GF-1 is designed for the GXR. Alternatively, Ricoh marketed both optical and electronic viewfinders which attach to the hot shoe. The GV-1 and GV-2 are optical viewfinders featuring the field of view equivalent to a 28 mm lens, and are intended to be used with the A12 28mm unit. The VF-2 electronic viewfinder offers 920,000 pixels and 100% field of view, and can be used with any unit.

== Camera and Mount Units ==
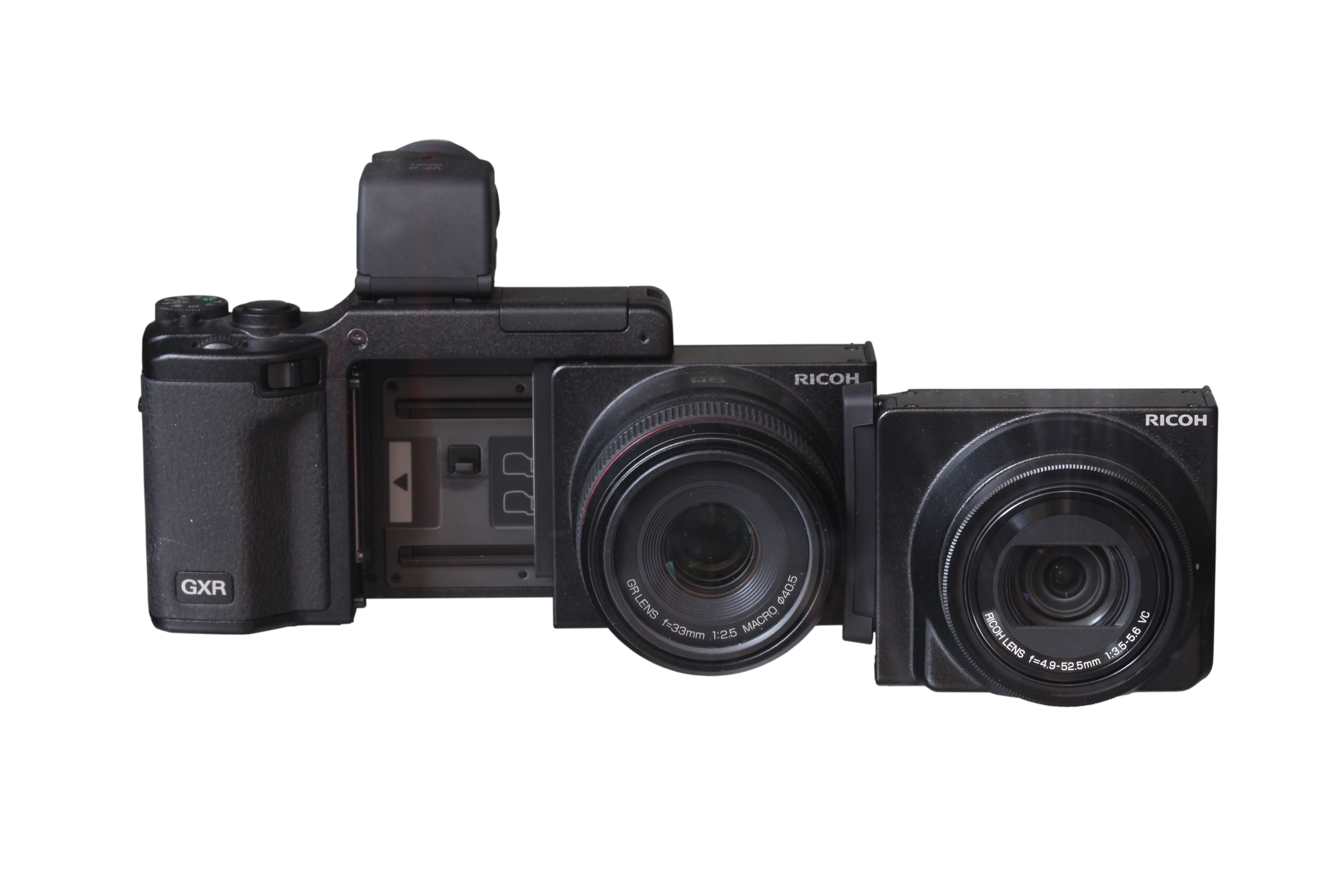
Ricoh GXR: body, A12 macro lens, and P10 28-300 mm equivalent lens

Officially, Ricoh released five Camera Units and one Lens Mount Unit. Journalist Thom Hogan has coined the "lensor" nickname for the Camera Units. The body accepts one unit at a time; each unit slides onto the body via a stainless steel rail and locks into place. To remove a unit, it can be released by a lever on the camera's body. Both the body and lens unit use magnesium alloy exterior.

Each Camera Unit (lens + sensor) has its own unique specifications relating to its sensor and optics, meaning that different lens units will change the features, behavior and performance of the camera body to varying degrees when attached. By pairing the lens and sensor as a single unit, Ricoh claim that each unit has these features optimised to one another and a specific task, whereas with conventional interchangeable lens cameras, each different lens must use the same sensor and engine. The sealed units also prevent dust from reaching the sensor, which can be a problem with other cameras where the sensor is exposed whilst a lens is being changed. However, a significant disadvantage of this system is the extra cost involved in having to buy a whole new sensor with every new lens.

The Lens Mount Unit was sold with a device used to check mechanical compatibility of lenses; some lenses extend deeply into the body and could cause interference with the sensor.

Ricoh GXR interchangeable module specifications
Lensor Feature		A12 28mm	A12 50mm	A16 24-85mm	P10	S10	GXR Mount (Leica M)
Unit Name		GR LENS A12 28mm F2.5	GR LENS A12 50mm F2.5 MACRO	RICOH LENS A16 24-85mm F3.5-5.5	RICOH LENS P10 28-300mm F3.5-5.6 VC	RICOH LENS S10 24-72mm F2.5-4.4 VC	GXR MOUNT A12
Image Sensor	Resolution (MP) Effective/Total	4288×2848; 12.3/12.9		4928×3264; 16.2/16.5	3648×2736; 10.0/10.6	3648×2736; 10.0/10.4	4288×2848; 12.3/12.9
Image Sensor	Type	CMOS			CMOS	CCD	CMOS
Image Sensor	Size	APS-C			1/2.3"	1/1.7"	APS-C
Lens	Focal length (35mm equiv.)	f=18.3mm (28mm)	f=33mm (50mm)	f=15.7~55.7mm (24~85mm)	f=4.9~52.5mm (28~300mm)	f=5.1~15.3mm (24~72mm) (Note: 0.79× or 4.0mm (19mm) with DW-6 at wide end; 1.88× or 28.8mm (135mm) with TC-1 at tele end. HA-3 required for these conversion lenses.)	varies with lens in use
Lens	Aperture	f/2.5–22		f/3.5–22 (wide) f/5.5–22 (tele)	f/3.5–7.0 (wide) f/5.6–15.4 (tele)	f/2.5–9.1 (wide) f/4.4–15.8 (tele)	varies with lens in use
Lens	Min. Focusing Dist.	20 cm (7.9 in)	7 cm (2.8 in)	25 cm (9.8 in)	1 cm (0.4 in) (wide); 27 cm (10.6 in) (tele)	1 cm (0.4 in) (wide); 4 cm (1.6 in) (tele)	varies with lens in use
Lens	Construction (Eles/Grps)	9E/6G (2 aspherical with 2 surfaces)	9E/8G (1 asph with 2 surfaces)	11E/9G (3 asph with 6 surfaces)	10E/7G (4 asph with 5 surfaces)	11E/7G (4 asph with 4 surfaces)	varies with lens in use
Lens	Filter Thread	40.5mm		55mm	—N/a	43mm (Note: with HA-3 accessory)	varies with lens in use
Shutter speeds (sec.)		180–1/3200			30–1/2000	180–1/2000	180–1/4000 (Note: Sync: 1/180)
Image stabilization		No			Yes, sensor shift		No
Imaging Engine		GR ENGINE III		Smooth Imaging Engine IV			?
Dimensions		68.7 mm × 57.9 mm × 50.4 mm (2.7 in × 2.3 in × 2.0 in)	68.7 mm × 57.9 mm × 71.3 mm (2.7 in × 2.3 in × 2.8 in)	71.4 mm × 70.5 mm × 93.3 mm (2.8 in × 2.8 in × 3.7 in)	68.7 mm × 57.9 mm × 44 mm (2.7 in × 2.3 in × 1.7 in)	68.7 mm × 57.9 mm × 38.6 mm (2.7 in × 2.3 in × 1.5 in)	79.1 mm × 60.9 mm × 40.5 mm (3.1 in × 2.4 in × 1.6 in) (Note: Flange-back distance: 27.8 mm (1.1 in))
Weight		210 g (7.4 oz)	263 g (9.3 oz)	350 g (12.3 oz)	160 g (5.6 oz)	161 g (5.7 oz)	170 g (6.0 oz)

== See also ==
- Minolta Dimage EX
- Other Modular Cameras
