= Minolta Dimage EX =

Minolta Dimâge EX
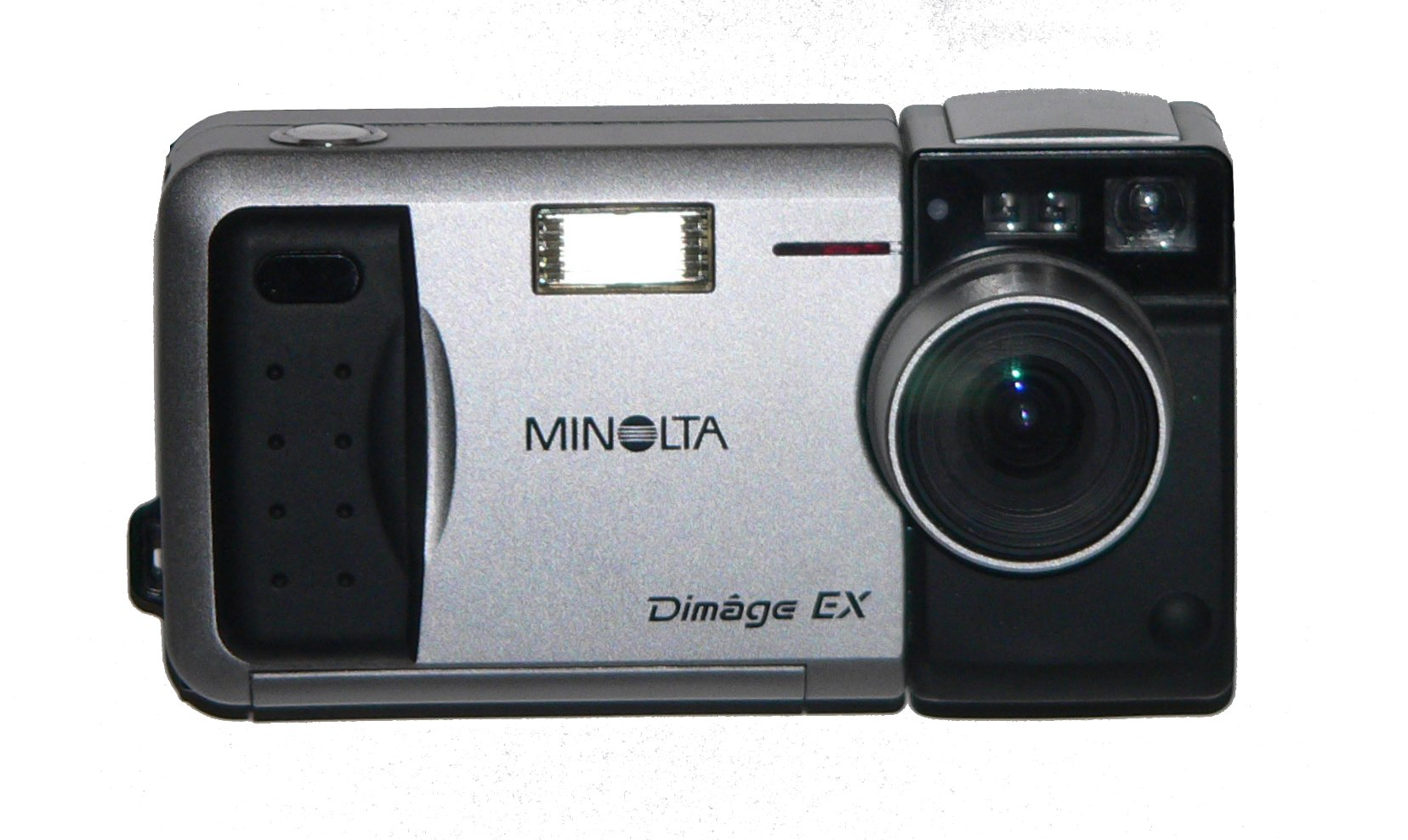

Overview
- Maker: Konica Minolta
- Type: Compact digital camera

Lens
- Lens: Detachable

Sensor/medium
- Sensor: CCD 0.5 inch
- Maximum resolution: 1344 × 1008
- Film speed: 125
- Storage media: Compact Flash

Focusing
- Focus modes: External passive AF

Exposure/metering
- Exposure modes: programmed AE
- Exposure metering: 25-segment TTL
- Metering modes: Automatic

Flash
- Flash: Guide number 11

Shutter
- Shutter: programmed AE
- Shutter speed range: from 1/4000 s to 2s
- Continuous shooting: 3,5 photo/s

Viewfinder
- Viewfinder: Optical

General
- LCD screen: 2 inches, 110 000 pixels
- Battery: four AA batteries; Ni-Cd, Ni-MH ou lithium AA batteries possible.
- Weight: without batteries: 310 g with zoom objective; 340 g with wide angle lens

The Minolta Dimâge EX (also sold as EX 1500) is a digital camera, first marketed in 1998. Similar to the earlier Minolta Dimâge V of 1996, the Dimâge EX line was one of the first consumer point-and-shoot cameras released in the American market and featured an unusual interchangeable lens system not normally found in point-and-shoot cameras.

The Dimâge EX line was originally intended to be "obsolescence-proof," in that it was designed with internal software that would be upgradable through downloads or patches based on FlashPoint Technology's Digita camera operating system, and that its lens interface would support future lens configurations. However, this concept was abandoned as Minolta continued on redesigning the Dimage line, eventually merging more SLR-style features into it.

== Features ==
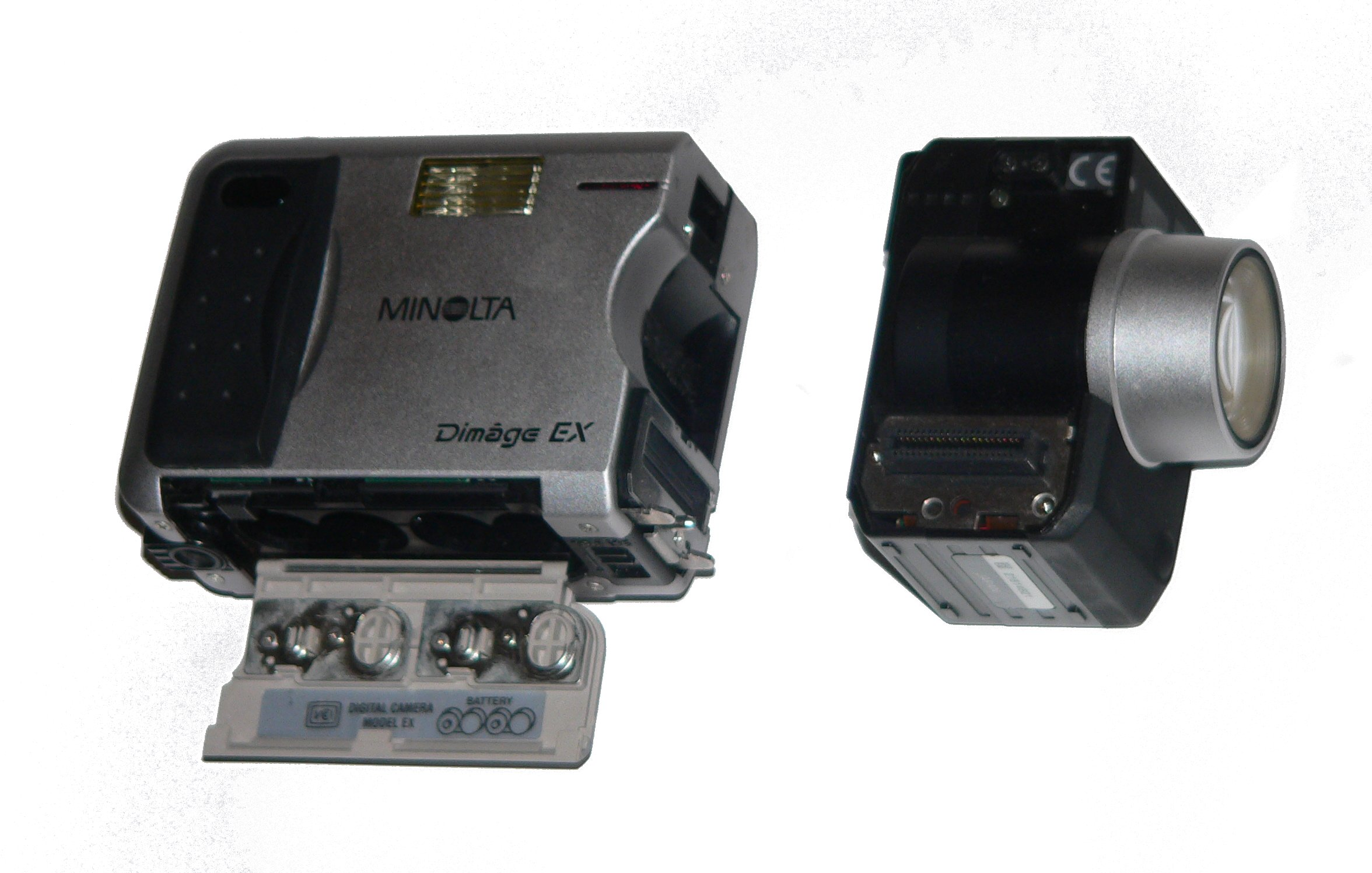
Dimage EX opened with lens detached

The Dimâge EX features a maximum resolution of 1344×1008 pixels and stores files in JPEG format. Though the term "megapixel" was not widely used at the time of its manufacture, it operates at 1.5 megapixels, a large file-size for non-SLR digital cameras of its time. It utilizes Compact Flash cards and initially shipped with a single 8 MB card.

The Dimâge EX's interchangeable lens assemblies set it apart from most point-and-shoot cameras. It initially shipped with a 3× zoom lens (the equivalent of 38-115mm focal length), named Dimâge EX 1500 Zoom, but Minolta also introduced a wide angle lens as Dimâge EX 1500 Wide that could replace the standard lens unit. In 1999, Minolta also marketed the Dimâge 3D 1500, incorporating MetaCreations' MetaFlash technology in a special flash accessory module to be mounted between the camera base and its lens in order to achieve stereoscopic photographs.

The port for the removable lens units also doubles as a port for a serial cable connection to a computer for direct downloading of photographs. The downloading process is handled via a packaged software interface called 'Digita Desktop'. The unit also has a separate dedicated video-out port which supports both PAL and NTSC video standards.

The Dimâge EX uses four standard AA batteries. However, the many features of the Dimage causes relatively fast draining of batteries, compared to other digital cameras of its time.

== See also ==
- Ricoh GXR
- Sony SmartShot
