= Macfusion =

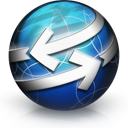
- Developers: Michael Gorbach and others
- Stable release: 2.0.4 / 3 December 2010
- Operating system: Mac OS X
- Type: FTPS/FTP/SSHFS client
- License: 2008: Apache-2.0; 2008: BSD-3-Clause
- Website: http://www.macfusionapp.org/
- Repository: github.com/mgorbach/MacFusion2

Macfusion was an open-source network file-system client, based on FUSE, CurlFtpFS and SSHFS.

== See also ==
- Filesystem in Userspace (FUSE)
- ExpanDrive
- WebDrive
