= Seed (programming) =

JavaScript interpreter and library

- Developers: Robert Carr, Matt Arsenault and Tim Horton
- Release: November 8, 2008; 17 years ago
- Stable release: 3.8.1 / April 16, 2013; 13 years ago
- Written in: C
- Available in: English
- Type: Interpreter, library
- License: GNU LGPL
- Website: wiki.gnome.org/Projects/Seed
- Repository: gitlab.gnome.org/GNOME/seed

Seed is a JavaScript interpreter and a library of the GNOME project to create standalone applications in JavaScript. It uses the JavaScript engine JavaScriptCore of the WebKit project. It is possible to easily create modules in C.

Seed is integrated in GNOME since the 2.28 version and is used by two games in the GNOME Games package. It is also used by the Web web browser for the design of its extensions. The module is also officially supported by the GTK+ project.

== Hello world in Seed ==
This example uses the standard output to output the string "Hello, World".

#!/usr/bin/env seed

print("Hello, world!");

== A program using GTK+ ==
This code shows an empty window named "Example".

#!/usr/bin/env seed

Gtk = imports.gi.Gtk;
Gtk.init(Seed.argv);

var window = new Gtk.Window({title: "Example"});

window.signal.hide.connect(Gtk.main_quit);
window.show_all();

Gtk.main();

== Modules ==
To use a module, just instantiate a class having for name imports. followed by the name of the module respecting the case sensitivity.

- The modules using GObject Introspection, who starts by imports.gi. :
  - Gtk
  - Gst
  - GObject
  - Gio
  - Clutter
  - GLib
  - Gdk
  - WebKit
  - GdkPixbuf, GdkPixbuf
- Libxml
- Cairo
- DBus
- MPFR
- Os (system library)
- Canvas (using Cairo)
- multiprocessing
- readline
- ffi
- sqlite
- sandbox

== List of the Seed versions ==
The names of the versions of Seed are albums of famous rock bands.

Version	Code Name	Release date
0.1		8 November 2008
0.3	Wednesday Morning 3AM	2 January 2009
0.5	Transformer	16 April 2009
0.6	Beatles for Sale	29 April 2009
0.7	Another Side of Bob Dylan	13 May 2009
0.8	Bringing It All Back Home	29 May 2009
0.8.5	Self Portrait	10 July 2009
2.27.90	London Calling	10 August 2009
2.27.91	Yellow Submarine	21 August 2009
2.27.92	Metal Machine Music	7 September 2009
2.28.0	The Rise and Fall of Ziggy Stardust and the Spiders	21 September 2009
2.29.2	Never Mind the Bollocks	16 November 2009
2.29.3		30 November 2009
2.29.4		17 December 2009
2.29.5	Icky Thump	1 January 2010
2.29.5.1	Achtung Baby	1 January 2010
2.29.5.2	Third Stage	7 January 2010
2.29.5.3	Twist and Shout	11 January 2010
2.29.90	Fort Nightly	8 February 2010
2.29.91	Greatest Hits	23 February 2010
2.30.0	Piano Man	29 March 2010
2.31.1	The Black Album	29 March 2010

== See also ==
- GNOME
- JavaScript
- Server-side JavaScript
- JavaScriptCore
- XULRunner
