= Digital photography =

Photography with a digital camera

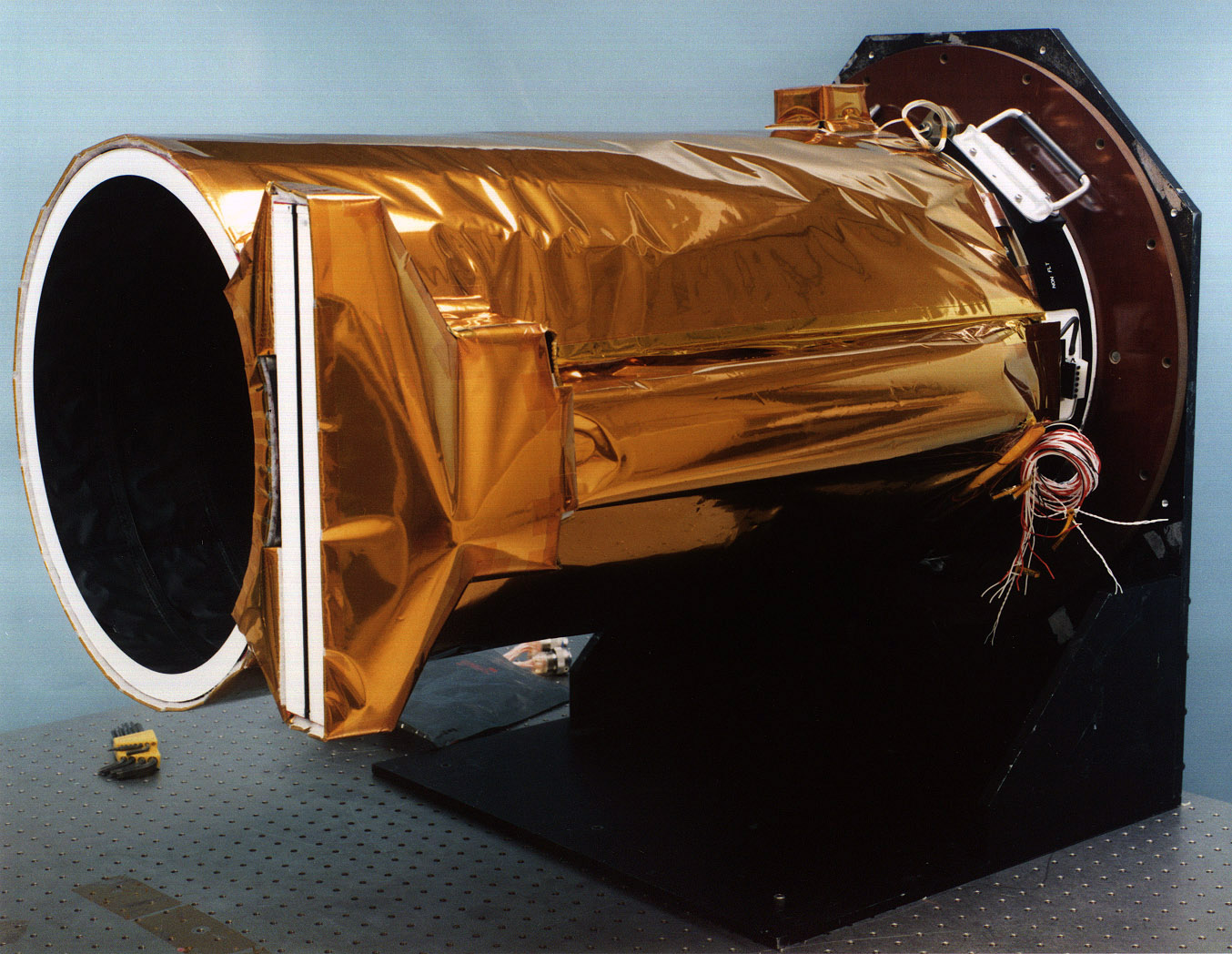
The Mars Orbiter Camera selected by NASA in 1986 (costing US$44 million) contains a 32-bit radiation-hardened 10 MHz processor and 12 MB of DRAM, then considered state of the art.

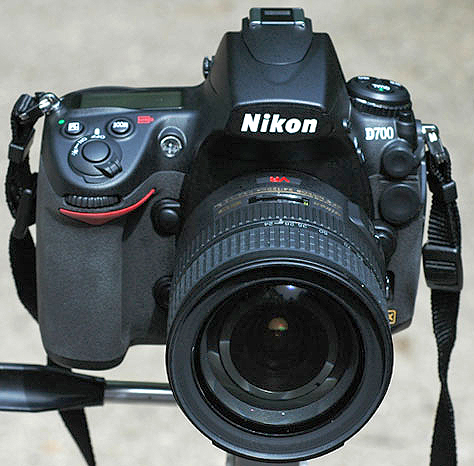
Nikon D700 — a 12.1-megapixel full-frame DSLR

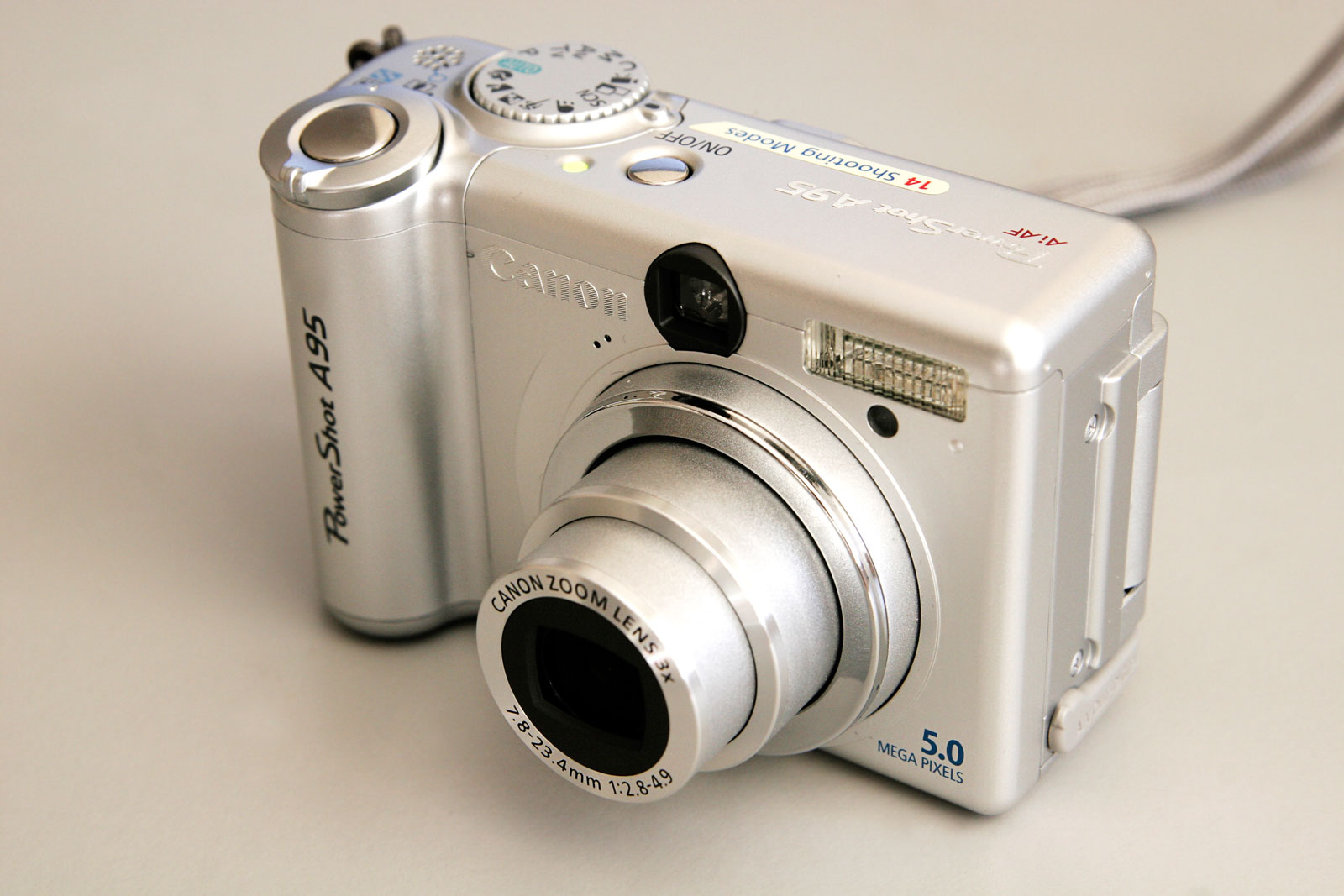
Canon PowerShot A95

Digital photography uses cameras containing arrays of electronic photodetectors interfaced to an analog-to-digital converter (ADC) to produce images focused by a lens, as opposed to an exposure on photographic film. The digitized image is stored as a computer file ready for further digital processing, viewing, electronic publishing, or digital printing. It is a form of digital imaging based on gathering visible light (or for scientific instruments, light in various ranges of the electromagnetic spectrum).

Until the advent of such technology, photographs were made by exposing light-sensitive photographic film and paper, which was processed in liquid chemical solutions to develop and stabilize the image. Digital photographs are typically created solely by computer-based photoelectric and mechanical techniques, without wet bath chemical processing.

In consumer markets, apart from enthusiast digital single-lens reflex cameras (DSLR), most digital cameras now come with an electronic viewfinder, which approximates the final photograph in real-time. This enables the user to review, adjust, or delete a captured photograph within seconds, making this a form of instant photography, in contrast to most photochemical cameras from the preceding era.

Moreover, the onboard computational resources can usually perform aperture adjustment and focus adjustment (via inbuilt servomotors) as well as set the exposure level automatically, so these technical burdens are removed from the photographer unless the photographer feels competent to intercede (and the camera offers traditional controls). Electronic by nature, most digital cameras are instant, mechanized, and automatic in some or all functions. Digital cameras may choose to emulate traditional manual controls (rings, dials, sprung levers, and buttons) or it may instead provide a touchscreen interface for all functions; most camera phones fall into the latter category.

Digital photography spans a wide range of applications with a long history. Much of the technology originated in the space industry, where it pertains to highly customized, embedded systems combined with sophisticated remote telemetry. Any electronic image sensor can be digitized; this was achieved in 1951. The modern era in digital photography is dominated by the semiconductor industry, which evolved later. An early semiconductor milestone was the advent of the charge-coupled device (CCD) image sensor, first demonstrated in April 1970; since then, the field has advanced rapidly, with concurrent advances in photolithographic fabrication.

The first consumer digital cameras were marketed in the late 1990s. Professionals gravitated to digital slowly, converting as their professional work required using digital files to fulfill demands for faster turnaround than conventional methods could allow. Starting around 2000, digital cameras were incorporated into cell phones; in the following years, cell phone cameras became widespread, particularly due to their connectivity to social media and email. Since 2010, the digital point-and-shoot and DSLR cameras have also seen competition from the mirrorless digital cameras, which typically provide better image quality than point-and-shoot or cell phone cameras but are smaller in size and shape than typical DSLRs. Many mirrorless cameras accept interchangeable lenses and have advanced features through an electronic viewfinder, which replaces the through-the-lens viewfinder of single-lens reflex cameras.

== History ==
While digital photography has only relatively recently become mainstream, the late 20th century saw many small developments leading to its creation. The history of digital photography began in the 1950s when, in 1951, the first digital signals were saved to magnetic tape via the first video tape recorder. Six years later, in 1957, the first digital image was produced through a computer by Russell Kirsch. It was an image of his son.

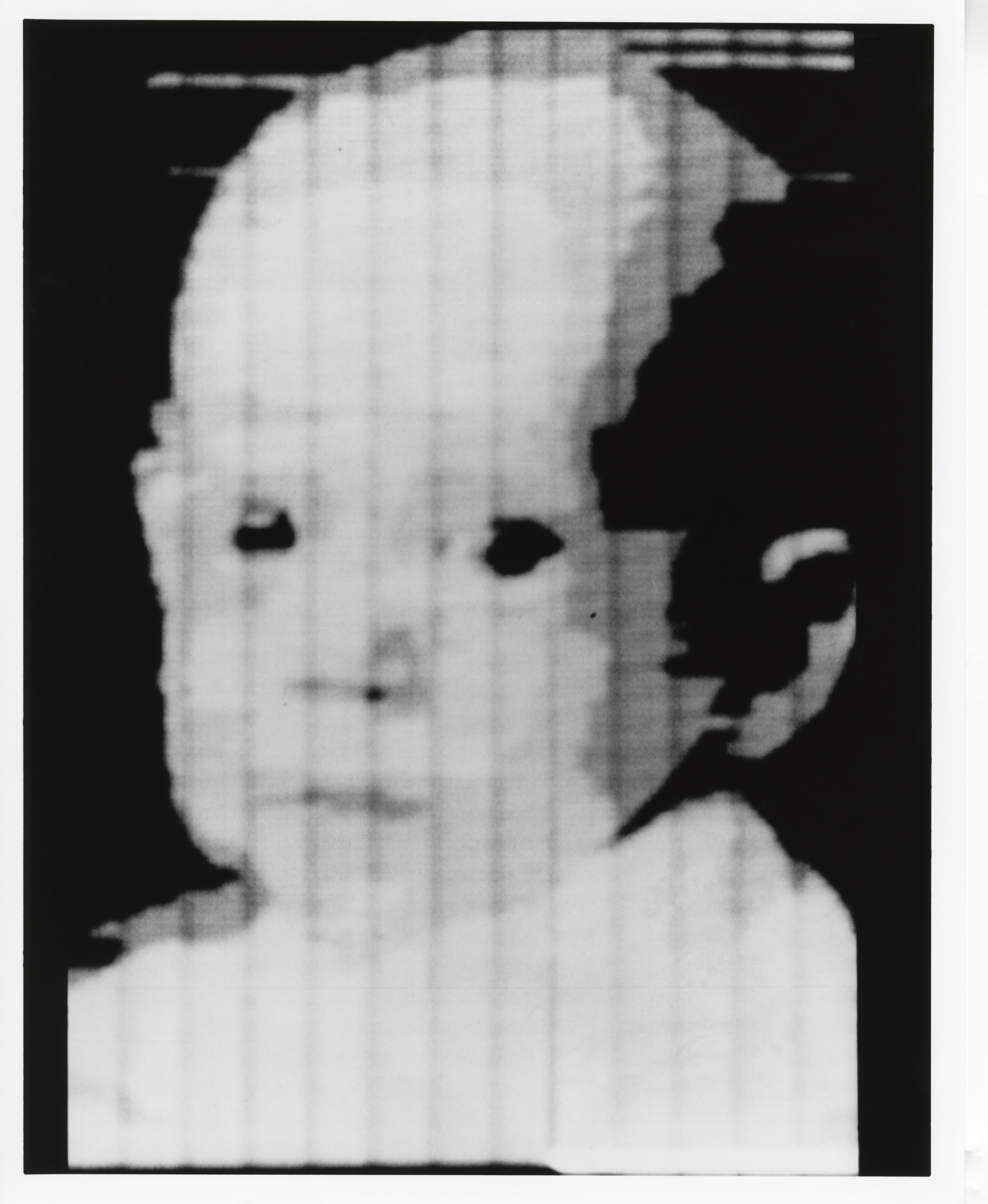
First digital image ever created, by Russell Kirsch. It is an image of his son, Walden.

The first semiconductor image sensor was the charge-coupled device (CCD), invented by physicists Willard S. Boyle and George E. Smith at Bell Labs in 1969. While researching the metal-oxide semiconductor (MOS) process, they realized that an electric charge was analogous to a magnetic bubble and that the charge could be stored on a tiny MOS capacitor. As it was fairly straightforward to fabricate a series of MOS capacitors in a row, they connected a suitable voltage to the capacitors so that the charge could be stepped along from one to the next. This semiconductor circuit was later used in the first digital video cameras for television broadcasting, and its invention was recognized by a Nobel Prize in Physics in 2009.

The first close-up image of Mars was taken as Mariner 4 flew by it on July 15, 1965, with a digital camera system designed by NASA and JPL. In 1976, the twin Mars landers Viking 1 and Viking 2 produced the first images from the surface of Mars. The imaging process was different from that of a modern digital camera, though the result was similar; Viking used a mechanically scanned facsimile camera rather than a mosaic of solid state sensor elements. This produced a digital image that was stored on tape for later, relatively slow transmission back to Earth.

The first published color digital photograph was produced in 1972 by Michael Francis Tompsett using CCD sensor technology and was featured on the cover of Electronics Magazine. It was a picture of his wife, Margaret Tompsett. The Cromemco Cyclops, a digital camera developed as a commercial product and interfaced to a microcomputer, was featured in the February 1975 issue of Popular Electronics magazine. It used MOS technology for its image sensor.

An important development in digital image compression technology was the discrete cosine transform (DCT), a lossy compression technique first proposed by Nasir Ahmed while he was working at the Kansas State University in 1972. DCT compression is used in the JPEG image standard, which was introduced by the Joint Photographic Experts Group in 1992. JPEG compresses images down to much smaller file sizes, and has become the most widely used image file format. The JPEG standard was largely responsible for popularizing digital photography.

The first self-contained (portable) digital camera was created in 1975 by Steven Sasson of Eastman Kodak. Sasson's camera used CCD image sensor chips developed by Fairchild Semiconductor in 1973. The camera weighed 8 pounds (3.6 kg), recorded black-and-white images to a cassette tape, had a resolution of 0.01 megapixels (10,000 pixels), and took 23 seconds to capture its first image in December 1975. The prototype camera was a technical exercise, not intended for production. While it was not until 1981 that the first consumer camera was produced by Sony, the groundwork for digital imaging and photography had been laid.

The first digital single-lens reflex (DSLR) camera was the Nikon SVC prototype demonstrated in 1986, followed by the commercial Nikon QV-1000C released in 1988. The first widely commercially available digital camera was the 1990 Dycam Model 1; it also sold as the Logitech Fotoman. It used a CCD image sensor, stored pictures digitally, and connected directly to a computer for downloading images. Originally offered to professional photographers for a hefty price, by the mid-to-late 1990s, due to technology advancements, digital cameras were commonly available to the general public.

The advent of digital photography also gave way to cultural changes in the field of photography. Unlike film photography, dark rooms and hazardous chemicals were no longer required for the post-production of an image – images could now be processed and enhanced from a personal computer. This allowed photographers to be more creative with their processing and editing techniques. As the field became more popular, digital photography and photographers diversified. Digital photography expanded the field of photography from a small, somewhat elite circle to one that encompassed many people.

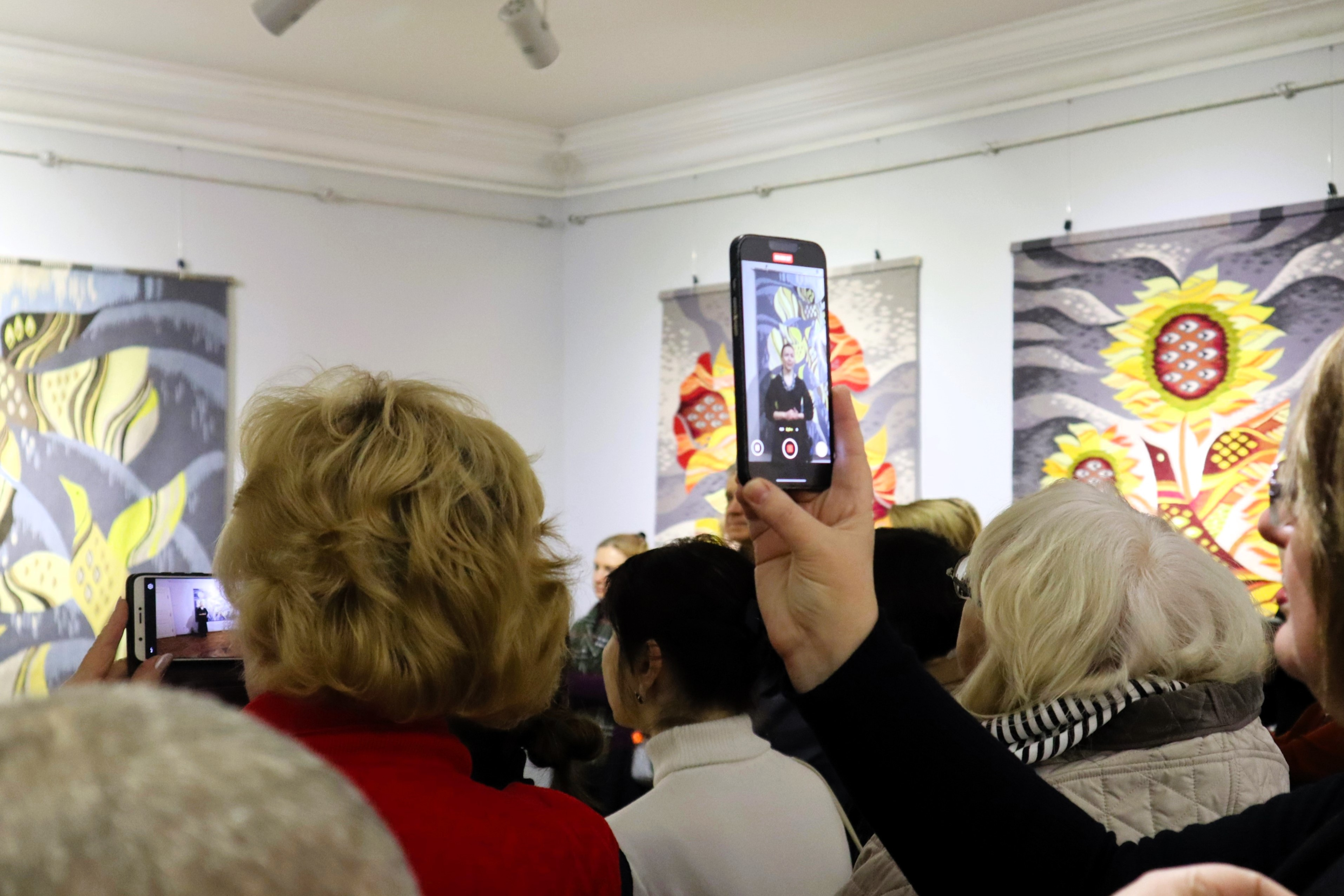
In-the-moment photography became more accessible with phone cameras

The camera phone further helped popularize digital photography, along with the Internet, social media, and the JPEG image format. The first cell phones with built-in digital cameras were produced in 2000 by Sharp and Samsung. Small, convenient, and easy to use, camera phones have made digital photography ubiquitous in the daily life of the general public.

== Digital camera ==
=== Sensors ===
Image sensors are arrays of electronic devices that convert the optical image created by the camera lens into a digital file that is stored in some digital memory device, inside or outside the camera. Each element of the image sensor array measures the intensity of light hitting a small area of the projected image (a pixel) and converts it to a digital value.

The two main types of sensors are charge-coupled devices (CCD)—in which the photo charge is shifted to a central charge-to-voltage converter—and CMOS or active pixel sensors.

Most cameras for the general consumer market create color images, in which each pixel has a color value from a three-dimensional color space like RGB. Although there is light-sensing technology that can distinguish the wavelength of the light incident on each pixel, most cameras use monochrome sensors that can only record the intensity of that light, over a broad range of wavelengths that includes all the visible spectrum. To obtain color images, those cameras depend on color filters applied over each pixel, typically in a Bayer pattern, or (rarely) on movable filters or light splitters such as dichroic mirrors. The resulting grayscale images are then combined to produce a color image. This step is usually performed by the camera itself, although some cameras may optionally provide the unprocessed grayscale images in a so-called raw image format.

Monochromatic image from a night-vision device

However, some special-purpose cameras, such as those for thermal mapping, or low light viewing, or high speed capture, may record only monochrome (grayscale) images. The Leica Monochrom cameras, for example, opted for a grayscale-only sensor to get better resolution and dynamic range. The reduction from three-dimensional color to grayscale or simulated sepia toning may also be performed by digital post-processing, often as an option in the camera itself. On the other hand, some multispectral cameras may record more than three color coordinates for each pixel.

=== Multifunctionality and connectivity ===
In most digital camera (except some high-end linear array cameras and simple, low-end webcams), a digital memory device is used for storing images, which may be transferred to a computer later. This memory device is usually a memory card; floppy disks and CD-RWs are less common.

In addition to taking pictures, digital cameras may also record sound and video. Some function as webcams, some use the PictBridge standard to connect to printers without using a computer, and some can display pictures directly on a television set. Similarly, many camcorders can take still photographs and store them on videotape or flash memory cards with the same functionality as digital cameras.

Digital photography is an example of the shift from analog information to digital information. In the past, conventional photography was an entirely chemical and mechanical process that did not require electricity. Now, modern photography is a digital process in which analog signals are converted to and stored as digital data using built-in computers.

=== Performance metrics ===
The quality of a digital image is a composite of various factors, many of which are similar to those of film cameras. Pixel count (typically listed in megapixels, millions of pixels) is only one of the major factors, though it is the most heavily marketed figure of merit. Digital camera manufacturers advertise this figure because consumers can use it to easily compare camera capabilities. It is not, however, the major factor in evaluating a digital camera for most applications. The processing system inside the camera that turns the raw data into a color-balanced and pleasing photograph is usually more critical, which is why some 4+ megapixel cameras perform better than higher-end cameras.

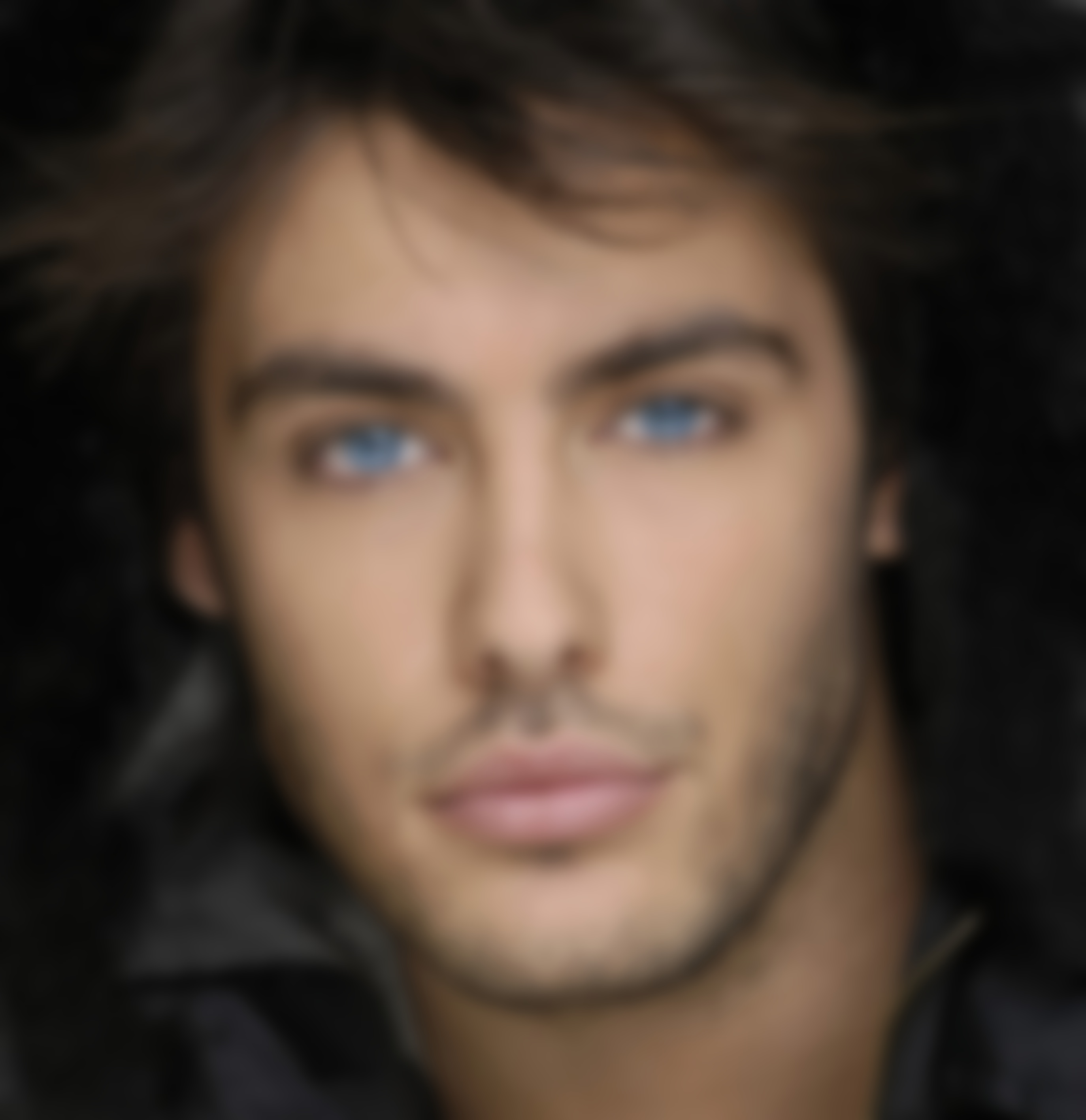
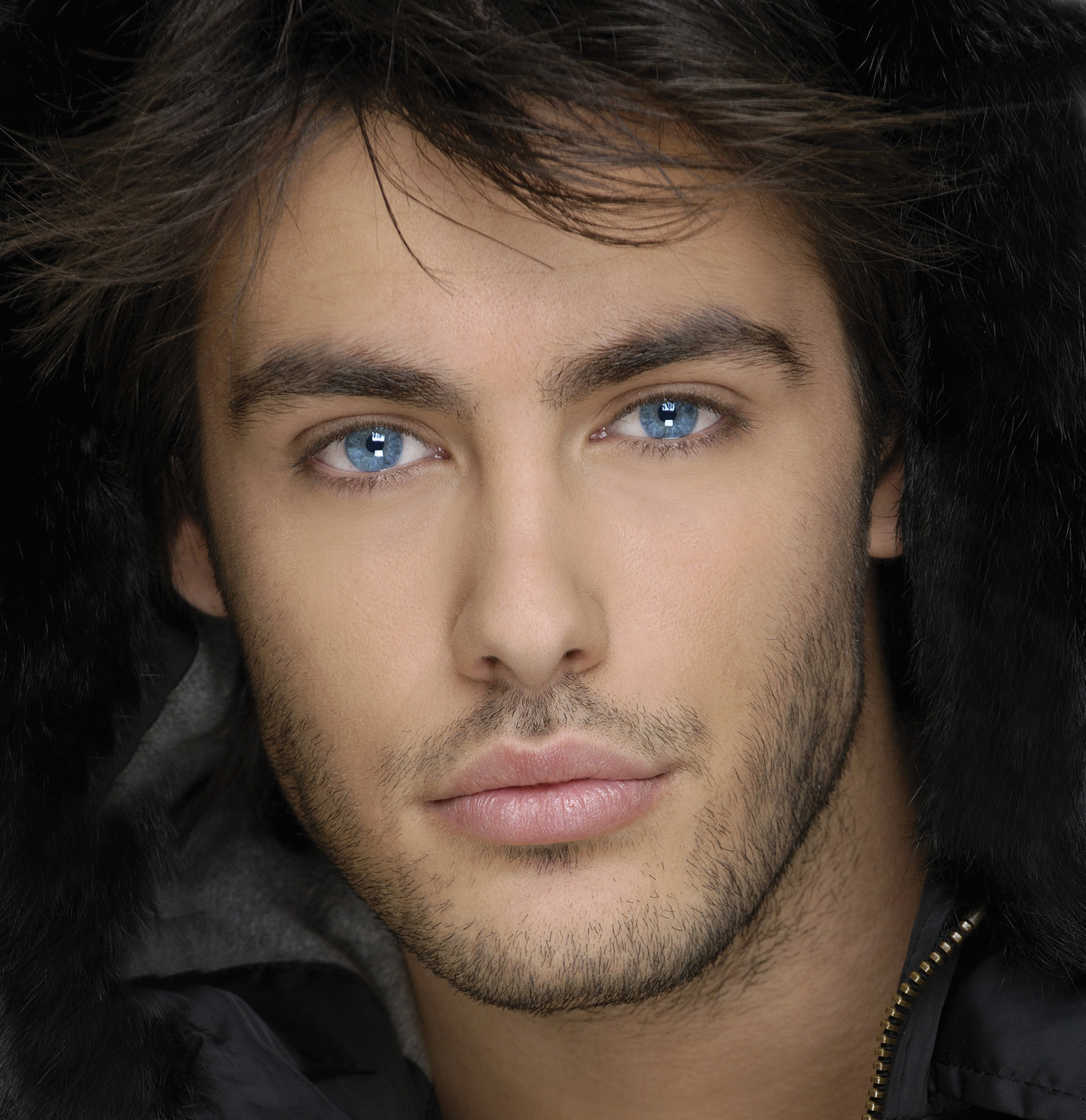
Image at left has a higher pixel count than the one to the right, but lower spatial resolution.

Resolution in pixels is not the only measure of image quality. A larger sensor with the same number of pixels generally produces a better image than a smaller one. One of the most important benefits of this is a reduction in image noise. This is one of the advantages of DSLR cameras, which have larger sensors than simpler point-and-shoot cameras of the same resolution.

Additional factors that impact the quality of a digital image include:

- Lens quality: resolution, distortion, dispersion (see Lens (optics))
- Capture medium: CMOS, CCD, negative film, reversal film
- Capture format: pixel count, digital file type (RAW, TIFF, JPEG), film format (135 film, 120 film), aspect ratio
- Processing: digital or chemical processing of "negative" and "print"

==== Pixel counts ====
The number of pixels n for a given maximum resolution (w horizontal pixels by h vertical pixels) is the product n = w × h. For example, an image 1600 × 1200 in size has 1,920,000 pixels, or 1.92 megapixels.

The pixel count quoted by manufacturers can be misleading as it may not be the number of full-color pixels. For cameras using single-chip image sensors, the number claimed is the total number of single-color-sensitive photosensors, whether they have different locations in the plane, as with the Bayer sensor, or in stacks of three co-located photosensors as in the Foveon X3 sensor. However, the images have different numbers of RGB pixels: Bayer-sensor cameras produce as many RGB pixels as photosensors via demosaicing (interpolation), while Foveon sensors produce uninterpolated image files with one-third as many RGB pixels as photosensors. Comparisons of megapixel ratings of these two types of sensors are sometimes a subject of dispute.

The relative increase in detail resulting from an increase in resolution is better compared by looking at the number of pixels across (or down) the picture, rather than the total number of pixels in the picture area. For example, a sensor of 2560 × 1600 sensor elements is described as "4 megapixels" (2560 × 1600= 4,096,000). Increasing to 3200 × 2048 increases the pixels in the picture to 6,553,600 (6.5 megapixels), a factor of 1.6, but the pixels per cm in the picture (at the same image size) increases by only 1.25 times. A measure of the comparative increase in linear resolution is the square root of the increase in area resolution (i.e., megapixels in the entire image).

==== Dynamic range ====
Both digital and film practical imaging systems have a limited "dynamic range": the range of luminosity that can be reproduced accurately. Highlights of the subject that are too bright are rendered as white, with no detail (overexposure); shadows that are too dark are rendered as black (underexposure). The loss of detail in the highlights is not abrupt with film, or in dark shadows with digital sensors. "Highlight burn-out" of digital sensors is not usually abrupt in output images due to the tone mapping required to fit their large dynamic range into the more limited dynamic range of the output (be it SDR display or printing). Because sensor elements for different colors saturate in turn, there can be hue or saturation shift in burnt-out highlights.

Some digital cameras can show these blown highlights in the image review, allowing the photographer to re-shoot the picture with a modified exposure. Others compensate for the total contrast of a scene by selectively exposing darker pixels longer. A third technique is used by Fujifilm in its FinePix S3 Pro DSLR: the image sensor contains additional photodiodes of lower sensitivity than the main ones; these retain detail in parts of the image too bright for the main sensor.

High-dynamic-range imaging (HDR) addresses this problem by increasing the dynamic range of images by either

- increasing the dynamic range of the image sensor, or
- using exposure bracketing and post-processing the separate images to create a single image with a higher dynamic range.

=== Storage ===
Many camera phones and most digital cameras use memory cards with flash memory to store image data. The majority of cards for separate cameras are Secure Digital (SD) format, or the older CompactFlash (CF) format; other formats are rare. XQD card format was the last new form of card, targeted at high-definition camcorders and high-resolution digital photo cameras. Most modern digital cameras also use internal memory of limited capacity to hold pictures temporarily, regardless of whether or not the camera is equipped with a memory card. These pictures can then be transferred later to a memory card or external device.

Memory cards can hold vast numbers of photos, requiring attention only when the memory card is full. For most users, this means hundreds of quality photos stored on the same memory card. Images may be transferred to other media for archival or personal use. Cards with high speed and capacity are suited to video and burst mode (capture several photographs in quick succession).

Because photographers rely on the integrity of image files, it is important to take proper care of memory cards. One process is card formatting, which essentially involves scanning the cards for possible errors. Common advocacy calls for formatting cards after transferring its images onto a computer. This clears previously stored data, such as the file system set up for an older camera, removes accumulated errors, and optimizes the file system for the particular camera model. Since all cameras only do quick formatting of cards, it is advisable to occasionally carry out a more thorough formatting using appropriate software on a computer.

== Comparison with film photography ==
=== Advantages already in consumer level cameras ===
The primary advantage of consumer-level digital cameras is the low recurring cost, as users need not purchase photographic film. Processing costs may be reduced or even eliminated. Digicams tend also to be easier to carry and use than comparable film cameras, and more easily adapt to modern use of pictures. Some, particularly those in smartphones, can send their pictures directly to email, web pages, or other electronic distribution.

=== Advantages of professional digital cameras ===
In professional usage, digital cameras offer many advantages in speed, precision, flexibility, ease, and cost.

- Immediacy: image review and deletion are possible immediately; lighting and composition can be assessed immediately, which ultimately conserves storage space.
- Faster workflow: management (color and file), manipulation, and printing tools are more versatile than conventional film processes. However, batch processing of RAW files can be time-consuming, even on a fast computer.
- Faster image ingest: it will take no more than a few seconds to transfer a high-resolution RAW file from a memory card vs many minutes to scan film with a high-quality scanner.
- Flash: using flash in images can provide a different look such as the lighting of the image.
- Higher image quantity: which enables longer photography sessions without changing film rolls. To most users, a single memory card is sufficient for the lifetime of the camera whereas film rolls are a re-incurring cost of film cameras.
- Precision and reproducibility of processing: since processing in the digital domain is purely numerical, image processing using deterministic (non-random) algorithms is perfectly reproducible and eliminates variations common with photochemical processing, and enables otherwise difficult or impractical processing techniques.
- Digital manipulation: a digital image can be modified and manipulated much easier and faster than with traditional negative and print methods.

Manufacturers such as Nikon and Canon have promoted the adoption of digital single-lens reflex cameras (DSLRs) by photojournalists. Images captured at 2+ megapixels are deemed of sufficient quality for small images in newspaper or magazine reproduction. 8- to 24-megapixel images, found in modern digital SLRs, when combined with high-end lenses, can approximate the detail of film prints from 35 mm film-based SLRs.

=== Disadvantages of digital cameras ===
- Aliasing: as with any sampled signal, the combination of the periodic pixel structure of common electronic image sensors and periodic structure of photographed objects (typically human-made objects) can cause objectionable aliasing artifacts, such as false colors when using cameras using a Bayer pattern sensor. Aliasing is also present in film, but typically manifests itself in less obvious ways (such as increased granularity) due to the stochastic grain structure (stochastic sampling) of film.
- Electricity-dependent: digital cameras cannot operate without electricity, usually provided via a battery. In contrast, a large number of mechanical film cameras existed, such as the Leica M2. These battery-less devices had advantages over digital devices in harsh or remote conditions.
- Limited sensor size: a persistent challenge in semiconductor fabrication is that chips much larger than 1 cm^{2} are expensive to produce without defects, confining large image sensor formats compatible with traditional 35 mm optics to professional and prosumer markets.

=== Equivalent features ===
Image noise and grain

Noise in a digital camera's image may sometimes be visually similar to film grain in a film camera.

Speed of use

Turn-of-the-century digital cameras had a long start-up delay compared to film cameras (that is, the delay from when they are turned on until they are ready to take the first shot), but this is no longer the case for modern digital cameras, which have start-up times under 1/4 seconds.

Frame rate

While some film cameras could reach up to 14 frames per second (fps), like the Canon F-1 with its rare high-speed motor drive, professional DSLR cameras can take still photographs at the highest frame rates. While the Sony SLT technology allows rates of up to 12 fps, the Canon EOS-1D X can take stills at a rate of 14 fps. The Nikon F5 is limited to 36 continuous frames (the length of the film) without the cumbersome bulk film back, while the digital Nikon D5 is able to capture over 100 14-bit RAW images before its buffer must be cleared and the remaining space on the storage media can be used.

Image longevity

Depending on the materials and how they are stored, analog photographic film and prints may fade as they age. Similarly, the media on which digital images are stored or printed can decay or become corrupt, leading to a loss of image integrity.

Color reproduction

Color reproduction (gamut) depends on the type and quality of film or sensor used and the quality of the optical system and film processing. Different films and sensors have different color sensitivity; the photographer needs to understand their equipment, the lighting conditions, and the media used to ensure accurate color reproduction. Many digital cameras offer RAW format (sensor data), which makes it possible to choose the color gamut in the development stage regardless of camera settings.

Even in RAW format, however, the sensor and the camera's dynamics can only capture colors within the gamut supported by the hardware. When that image is transferred for reproduction on any device, the widest achievable gamut is the gamut that the end device supports. For a monitor, it is the gamut of the display device. For a photographic print, it is the gamut of the device that prints the image on a specific type of paper.

Professional photographers often use specially designed and calibrated monitors that help them to reproduce color accurately and consistently.

=== Frame aspect ratios ===
Most digital point-and-shoot cameras have an aspect ratio of 1.33 (4:3), the same as analog television or early movies. However, a 35 mm picture's aspect ratio is 1.5 (3:2). Several digital cameras take photos in either ratio. Nearly all digital SLRs take pictures in a 3:2 ratio, as most can use lenses designed for 35 mm film. However, a few older Four Thirds digital SLRs used a 4:3 ratio. Some photo labs print photos on 4:3 ratio paper, as well as the existing 3:2.

In 2005, Panasonic launched the first consumer camera with a native aspect ratio of 16:9, matching HDTV. This is similar to a 7:4 aspect ratio, which was a common size for APS film.

Different aspect ratios are one of the reasons consumers have issues when cropping photos. An aspect ratio of 4:3 translates to a size of 4.5"×6.0". This loses half an inch when printing on the "standard" size of 4"×6", an aspect ratio of 3:2. Similar cropping occurs when printing on other sizes, such as 5"×7", 8"×10", or 11"×14".

== Market impact ==
In late 2002, the cheapest digital cameras in the United States were available for around $100 (USD). At the same time, many discount stores with photo labs introduced a "digital front end", allowing consumers to obtain true chemical prints (as opposed to ink-jet prints) in an hour. These prices were similar to those of prints made from film negatives.

In July 2003, digital cameras entered the disposable camera market with the release of the Ritz Dakota Digital, a 1.2-megapixel (1280 × 960) CMOS-based digital camera costing only $11. Following the familiar single-use concept long in use with film cameras, Ritz intended the Dakota Digital for single use. When the pre-programmed 25-picture limit is reached, the camera is returned to the store, and the consumer receives back prints and a CD-ROM with their photos. The camera is then refurbished and resold.

Since the introduction of the Dakota Digital, a number of similar single-use digital cameras have appeared. Most single-use digital cameras are nearly identical to the original Dakota Digital in specifications and function, though a few include superior specifications and more advanced functions (such as higher image resolutions and LCD screens). Most, if not all these single-use digital cameras cost less than $20, not including processing. However, the huge demand for complex digital cameras at competitive prices has often caused manufacturing shortcuts, evidenced by a large increase in customer complaints over camera malfunctions, high parts prices, and short service life. Some digital cameras offer only a 90-day warranty.

Since 2003, digital cameras have outsold film cameras. Prices of 35 mm compact cameras have dropped with manufacturers further outsourcing to countries such as China. Kodak announced in January 2004 that they would no longer sell Kodak-branded film cameras in the developed world. In January 2006, Nikon followed suit and announced they would stop production of all but two models of their film cameras. They will continue to produce the low-end Nikon FM10, and the high-end Nikon F6. In the same month, Konica Minolta announced it was pulling out of the camera business altogether. The price of 35 mm and Advanced Photo System (APS) compact cameras have dropped, probably due to direct competition from digital cameras and the resulting availability of second-hand film cameras. Pentax have reduced but not halted production of film cameras. The technology has improved so rapidly that one of Kodak's film cameras was discontinued before it was awarded a "camera of the year" award later in the year.

The decline in film camera sales has also led to a decline in purchases of film for such cameras. In November 2004, a German division of Agfa-Gevaert, AgfaPhoto, split off. Within six months it filed for bankruptcy. Konica Minolta Photo Imaging, Inc., ended production of color film and paper worldwide by March 31, 2007. In addition, by 2005, Kodak employed less than a third of the employees it had twenty years earlier. It is not known if these job losses in the film industry have been offset in the digital image industry. Digital cameras have decimated the film photography industry through the declining use of the expensive film rolls and development chemicals previously required to develop the photos. This has had a dramatic effect on companies such as Fuji, Kodak, and Agfa. Many stores that formerly offered photofinishing services or sold film no longer do, or have seen a tremendous decline. In 2012, Kodak filed for bankruptcy after struggling to adapt to the changing industry.

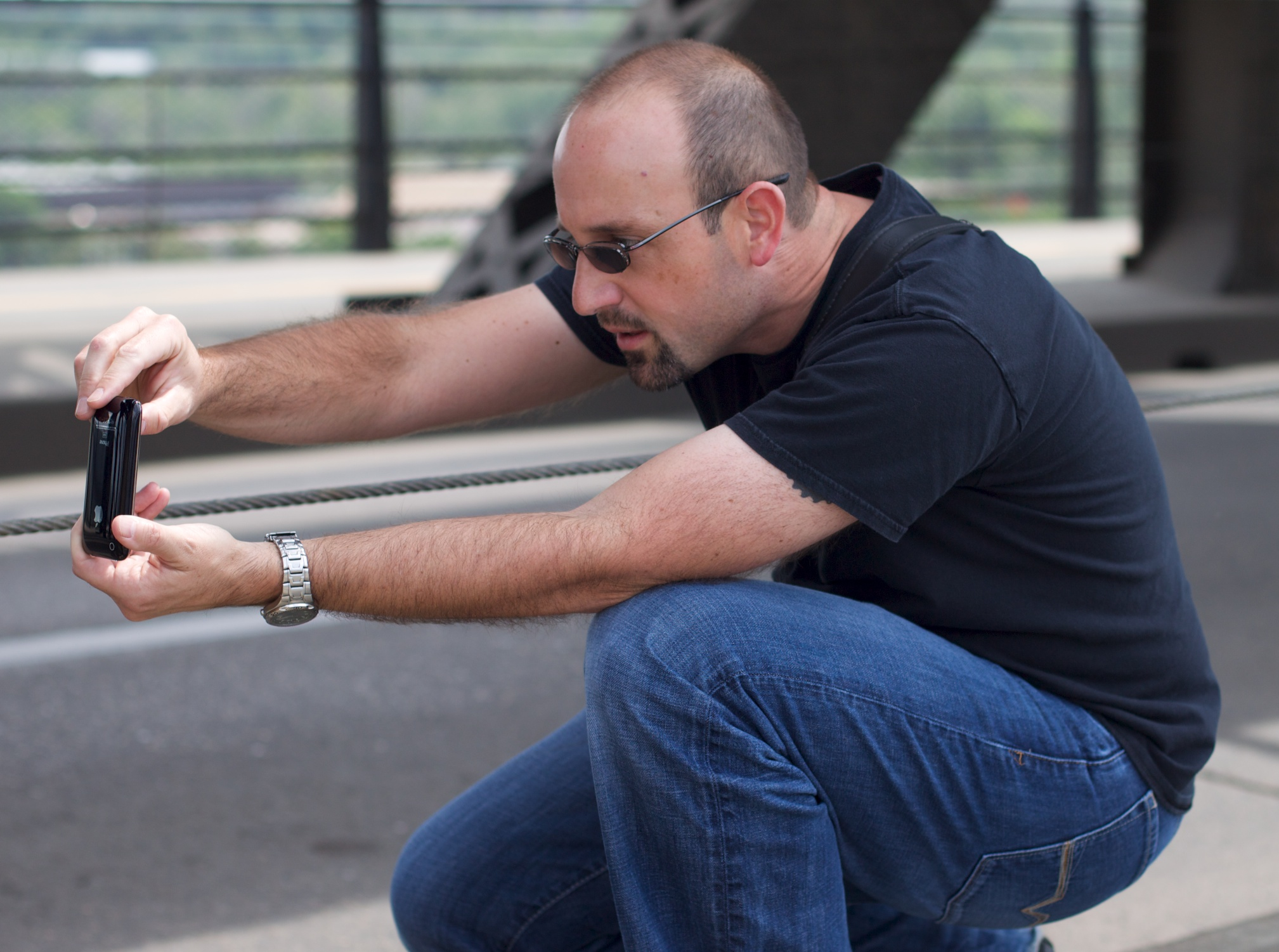
A man takes a photo with a smartphone, holding it somewhat awkwardly, as the form factor of a phone is not optimized for use as a camera.

Digital camera sales peaked in March 2012, averaging about 11 million units a month, but sales have declined significantly ever since. By March 2014, about 3 million were purchased each month, about 30 percent of the peak sales total. The decline may have bottomed out, with sales average hovering around 3 million a month. The main competitor is smartphones, most of which have built-in digital cameras and are routinely improved. Like most digital cameras, they also offer the ability to record videos. While smartphones continue to improve on a technical level, their form factor is not optimized for use as a camera, and their battery life is typically more limited compared to a digital camera.

Digital photography has resulted in some positive market impacts as well. The increasing popularity of products such as digital photo frames and canvas prints is a direct result of the increasing popularity of digital photography.

=== Social impact ===
Digital photography has made photography available to a larger group of people. New technology and editing programs available to photographers have changed the way photographs are presented to the public. Photographs can be heavily manipulated or photoshopped to look completely different from the originals. Until the advent of the digital camera, amateur photographers used either print or slide film for their cameras. Slides had to be developed and shown to an audience using a slide projector. Digital photography eliminated the delay and cost of film. Consumers became able to view, transfer, edit, and distribute digital images with ordinary home computers rather than using specialized equipment.

Camera phones have recently had a large impact on photography. Users can set their smartphones to upload products to the Internet, preserving images even if the camera is destroyed or the photos deleted. Some high-street photography shops have self-service kiosks that allow images to be printed directly from smartphones via Bluetooth technology.

Archivists and historians have noticed the transitory nature of digital media. Unlike film and print which are tangible, digital image storage is ever-changing, with old media and decoding software becoming obsolete or inaccessible by new technologies. Historians are concerned that this is creating a historical void where information is being silently lost within failed or inaccessible digital media. They recommend that professional and amateur users develop strategies for digital preservation by migrating stored digital images from old technologies to new ones. Scrapbookers who may have used film for creating artistic and personal memoirs may need to modify their approach to use and personalize digital photo books, thereby retaining the special qualities of traditional photo albums.

The web has been a popular medium for storing and sharing photos ever since the first photograph was published online by Tim Berners-Lee in 1992 (an image of the CERN house band Les Horribles Cernettes). Today, photo sharing sites such as Flickr, Picasa, and PhotoBucket, as well as social websites, are used by millions of people to share their pictures. Digital photography and social media allow organizations and corporations to make photographs more accessible to a greater and more diverse population. For example, National Geographic Magazine has Twitter, Snapchat, Facebook, and Instagram accounts, each of which includes content aimed at the specific audiences found on its platform.

Digital photography has also impacted other fields, such as medicine. It has allowed doctors to help diagnose diabetic retinopathy, and is used in hospitals to diagnose and treat other diseases.

==== Digitally altered imagery ====
In digital art and media art, digital photos are often edited, manipulated, or combined with other digital images. Scanography is a related process in which digital photos are created using a scanner.

New technology in digital cameras and computer editing affects the way photographic images are now perceived. The ability to create and fabricate realistic imagery digitally—as opposed to untouched photos—changes the audience's perception of "truth" in digital photography. Digital manipulation enables pictures to adjust the perception of reality, both past and present, and thereby shape people's identities, beliefs, and opinions.

== Digital photography and social media ==
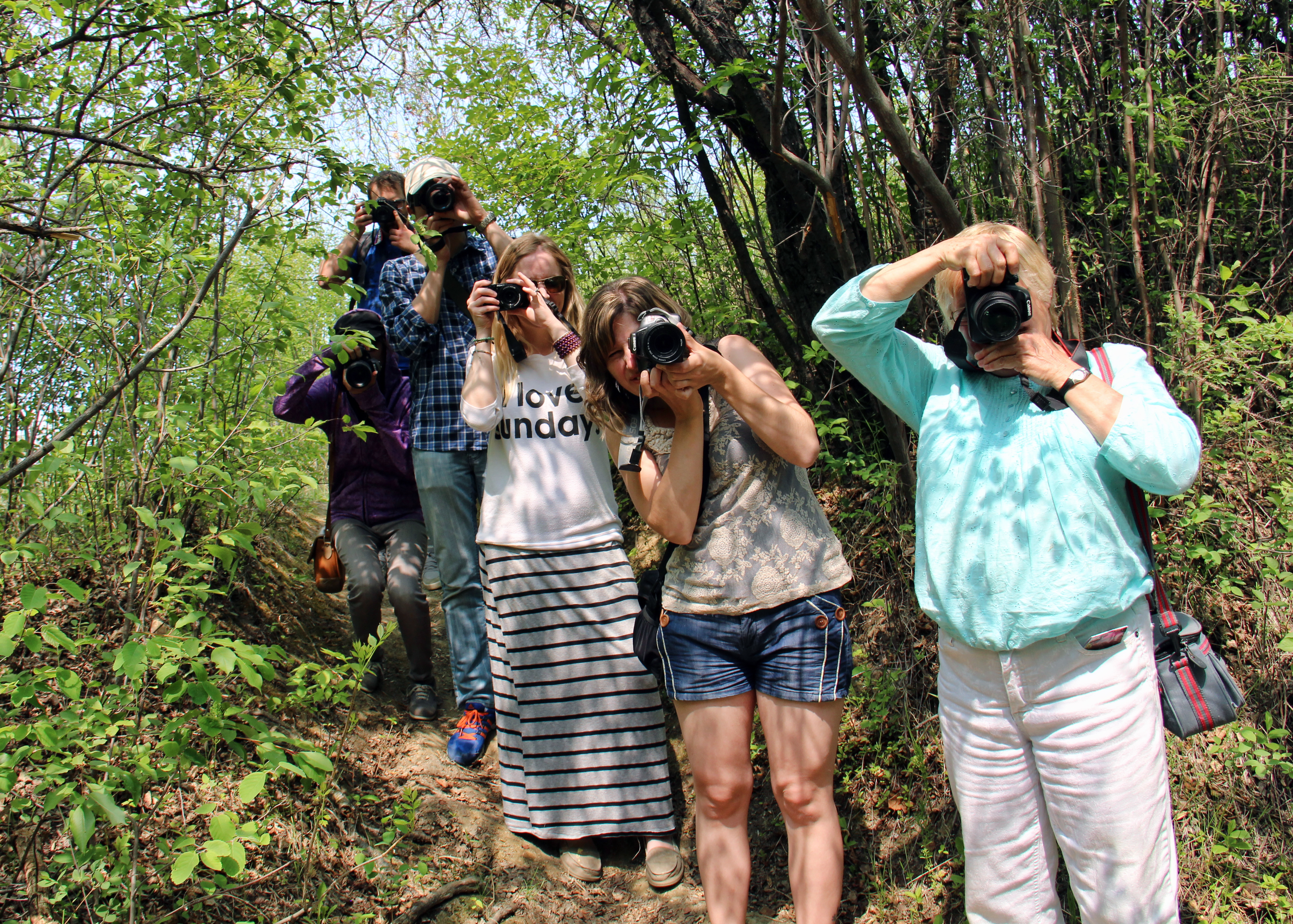
Modern day students have more access to photography classes as a result of digital photography's ease in comparison to film.

In its early stages, photography was mainly used for physically preserving a family's heritage. It has now evolved into a key part of individual identity in the 21st century. Internet users often personally photograph and repost pictures that revolve around the ways they want to personally express themselves and their chosen aesthetic. With the invention of digital photography, photographs became less destructible and more easily maintained throughout the years, living across all types of digital devices. Digital photography advanced the use of photos for communication and identity rather than as a means of remembering.

Widespread access to digital photography has greatly influenced social behavior. The phrase "pics or it didn't happen" reflects the notion that one's life experiences can only be verified by others through photographs.

Filters are commonly used in social digital photography, some of which reflect the nostalgic gap left by the disappearance of film photography. Filters that emulated traditional analog effects (such as film grain, scratches, fading, and polaroid borders) grew immensely in popularity alongside the idea of social photography, the causal sharing of everyday images. Social photos differ from "true" photography as they are not meant to carry the same value or artistic qualities.

== Recent research and innovation ==
- 3D models can be created from collections of normal images. The resulting scene can be viewed from novel viewpoints, but creating the model is very computationally intensive. An example is Microsoft's Photosynth, which provided some models of famous places as examples.
- Panoramic photographs can be created directly in camera without the need for any external processing. Some cameras feature a 3D Panorama capability, combining shots taken with a single lens from different angles to create a sense of depth.
- Virtual-reality photography, the interactive visualization of photos.
- High-dynamic-range cameras and displays are commercially available. Sensors with dynamic range in excess of 1,000,000:1 are in development, and software is also available to combine multiple non-HDR images (shot with different exposures) into an HDR image.
- Motion blur can be dramatically removed by a flutter shutter (a flickering shutter that adds a signature to the blur, which postprocessing recognizes). It is not yet commercially available.
- Advanced bokeh techniques use a hardware system of 2 sensors, one to take the photo as usual while the other records depth information. Bokeh effect and refocusing can then be applied to an image after the photo is taken.
- In advanced cameras or camcorders, manipulating the sensitivity of the sensor with two or more neutral density filters.
- An object's specular reflection can be captured using computer-controlled lights and sensors. This is needed to create attractive images of oil paintings, for instance. It is not yet commercially available, but some museums are starting to use it.
- Dust reduction systems help keep dust off of image sensors. Originally introduced only by a few cameras like Olympus DSLRs, they have now become standard in most models and brands of detachable lens cameras, except the low-end or cheap ones.

Other areas of progress include improved sensors, more powerful software, advanced camera processors (sometimes using more than one processor; for instance, the Canon 7D camera has two Digic 4 processors), enlarged gamut displays, built-in GPS and Wi-Fi, and computer-controlled lighting.

== See also ==
- Analog photography
- Automatic image annotation
- Camcorder
- Chimping
- Design rule for Camera File system (DCF)
- Digital camera
- Digital image editing
- Digital imaging
- Digital microscope
  - USB microscope
- Digital photo frame
- Digital Print Order Format (DPOF)
- Digital Revolution
- Digital single-lens reflex camera
- Digital watermarking
- Exif (Exchangeable image file format)
- Geotagged photograph
- High-dynamic-range imaging
- Lenses for SLR and DSLR cameras
- List of digital camera brands
- Online proofing
- Raw image format
- 3D camcorder
