= GPhoto =

Software

gPhoto
- Release: July 10, 2012; 14 years ago
- Stable release: libgphoto2 2.5.34 / gphoto2 2.5.32 / libgphoto2 May 30, 2026; 4 months ago / gphoto2 August 11, 2025; 14 months ago
- Operating system: Linux, BSD, Unix-like
- Type: Digital photography
- License: GNU LGPL
- Website: gphoto.sourceforge.net
- Repository: github.com/gphoto/gphoto2

gPhoto is the name of a free, redistributable, ready to use set of digital camera software applications for Unix-like systems. The core functionality is provided by libgphoto2, which is a library for use in digital photography - it supports retrieving of images from camera devices, upload, and remote controlled configuration and capture, depending on whether the camera supports those features. libgphoto2 is the successor of gphoto with lots of new features and additional camera drivers.

libgphoto2 is the basis for image acquisition and camera interfacing on Linux, and is used by applications such as Darktable, DigiKam, Shotwell, Entangle, GIMP, gThumb, and others.

gPhoto2 is also the name of the command line (CLI) interface to libgphoto2. gPhoto2 and libgphoto2 have been released alongside each other with the same version number until 2.5.28.

Released under the GNU Lesser General Public License, gPhoto is free software.

== Support ==
libgphoto2 has 2979 "supported cameras and media players" as of August 2025. It is cross-platform, running under Linux, FreeBSD, NetBSD and other Unix-like operating systems.

gPhoto has support for the Picture Transfer Protocol (PTP) and will also connect to devices that use the Media Transfer Protocol (MTP). Many cameras are not supported by gPhoto, but have support for the USB mass storage device class, which is well-supported under Linux. gPhoto intentionally does not implement support for USB mass storage cameras, as this is already implemented in-kernel.

gPhoto supports camera tethering control, preview, viewfinder in PTP or camera specific protocols on numerous cameras.

== Applications ==
gPhoto provides a library, libgphoto2, to allow for other frontends to be written for it, and a command-line interface. gtkam is a reference implementation for a graphical libgphoto2 client based on GTK2. Other clients are the KDE program digiKam and the GNOME program Shotwell (and many others). GVfs uses libgphoto2 to expose on-camera photos to GNOME applications via a virtual filesystem.

DigiKam, gtkam and Entangle support tethering capture and viewfinder for supported cameras.
