= GnomeVFS =

Deprecated GNOME software

- Operating system: Linux, BSD
- Platform: GNOME
- Type: abstraction layer for files systems
- Website: developer.gnome.org/gnome-vfs/

GnomeVFS (short for GNOME Virtual File System) was an abstraction layer of the GNOME platform for the reading, writing and execution of files. Before GNOME 2.22 GnomeVFS was primarily used by the appropriate versions of Nautilus file manager (renamed to GNOME Files) and other GNOME applications.

A cause of confusion is the fact that the file system abstraction used by the Linux kernel is also called the virtual file system (VFS) layer. This is however at a lower level.

Due to perceived shortcomings of GnomeVFS a replacement called GVfs was developed. GVfs is based on GIO and allows partitions to be mounted through FUSE.

With the release of GNOME 2.22 in April 2008, GnomeVFS was declared deprecated in favor of GVfs and GIO, requesting that developers not use it in new applications.
