= Dokan =

Dokan may refer to:

- Lake Dokan, Iraq
- Dokan District, Iraq
- Dokan Library, free Microsoft Windows open source filesystem in userspace

== See also ==
- Dukaan, a 2024 Indian film
