= WikipediaFS =

Virtual filesystem

- Developer: Mathieu Blondel
- Release: 11 June 2006; 20 years ago
- Stable release: 0.4 / 2 August 2010; 16 years ago
- Preview release: r75 / 10 July 2015; 11 years ago
- Written in: Python
- Operating system: Mac OS X, Linux, FreeBSD
- Type: Filesystem
- License: GNU GPL
- Website: wikipediafs.sourceforge.net
- Repository: svn.code.sf.net/p/wikipediafs/code/

WikipediaFS is a virtual filesystem which allows users to view and edit the articles of any MediaWiki-based site as if they were real files on a local disk drive. This enables a user to edit articles directly with any text editor. WikipediaFS is developed primarily by Mathieu Blondel on SourceForge.net.

WikipediaFS is implemented in Python and uses the FUSE kernel module. The file system works by lazily downloading and uploading article sourcetexts — only sending HTTP requests to the selected site when a file is accessed. (Reading a file corresponds to a GET HTTP request, writing to a POST HTTP request.)

== Advantages ==
- Editing a long Wikipedia article can sometimes turn out to be painful and time-consuming due to web-forms limitations. Instead, when WikipediaFS is mounted on a directory, articles become like real files in that directory: it is thus possible to use a text-editor to edit files. Text-editors are generally more stable and less sluggish than browsers and have useful features such as spell checking and wiki syntax highlighting.
- It is possible to write programs or bots transparently as if they dealt with simple files because WikipediaFS takes care of the HTTP layer. For example, WikipediaFS could be used to perform a massive content migration from one MediaWiki site to another.

== Disadvantages ==
- The project is no longer maintained as of 2007; the software has since been deprecated.
- It is difficult to go from-page-to-page; users must know the exact name of a page in order to edit it, as WikipediaFS has no local knowledge of what pages exist and which don't.

== See also ==
- Wikifs
