= GVfs =

Userspace virtual filesystem software for the GNOME desktop environment

- Stable release: 1.61.91 / 27 August 2026
- Operating system: Linux
- Platform: GNOME
- Type: abstraction layer for the files system
- License: LGPL-2.0-or-later
- Website: gitlab.gnome.org/GNOME/gvfs
- Repository: gitlab.gnome.org/GNOME/gvfs.git

GVfs (abbreviation for GNOME virtual file system) is GNOME's userspace virtual filesystem designed to work with the I/O abstraction of GIO, a library available in GLib since version 2.15.1. It installs several modules that are automatically used by applications using the APIs of libgio. There is also FUSE support that allows applications not using GIO to access the GVfs filesystems.

A cause of confusion is the fact that the file system abstraction used by the Linux kernel is also called the virtual file system (VFS) layer. This is however at a lower level.

The GVfs model differs from e.g. GnomeVFS, which it replaces, in that file systems must be mounted before they are used. There is a master daemon (gvfsd) that handles coordinating mounts, and then each mount is (typically) in its own daemon process (although mounts can share daemon process).

GVfs comes with a set of back-ends, including trash support, SFTP, FTP, WebDAV, SMB, and local data via Udev integration, OBEX, MTP and others. GVfs does not seem to support the Files transferred over shell protocol (FISH).

GVfs also contains modules for GIO that implement volume monitors and the GNOME URI scheme handler configuration.

There is a set of arguments to the command line program "gio" that lets you run commands (like cat, ls, stat, mount, etc.) on files in the GVfs mounts.

Attached resources are exposed via a URI syntax, for example smb://server01/gamedata or ftp://username:password@ftp.example.net/public_html, but are also mounted in the traditional manner under ~/.gvfs/ or /run/user/$UID/gvfs or $XDG_RUNTIME_DIR/gvfs directory to make them available to applications using standard POSIX commands and I/O.

== Technical details ==
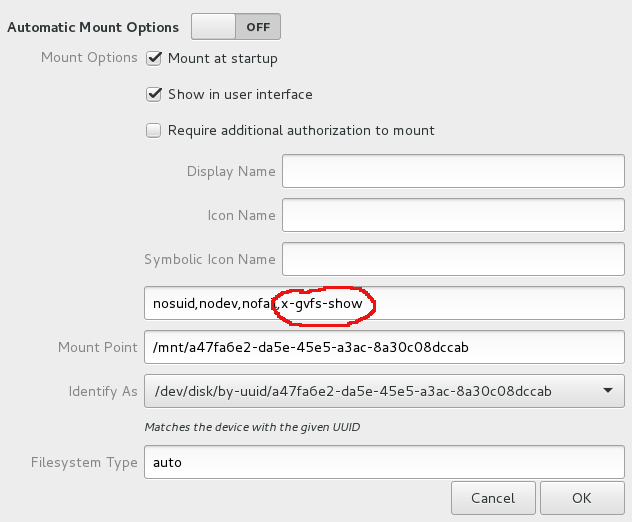
The option x-gvfs-show for the gvfs-udisks2-volume-monitor process determines whether a mounted device is shown or not in GNOME Files. Screenshot of GNOME Disks.

Along with generally useful APIs such as networking and D-Bus support, GIO also provides a VFS API to applications. GVfs provides implementations that go beyond that and allow to access files and storage using many protocols. GVfs provides implementations for various network file systems as loadable modules. Additionally GVfs also provides support for trash, network or recent folders, for CD burning and for monitoring interesting devices and volumes on the computer.

The goal of GVfs has been to overcome the shortcomings of GnomeVFS and provide an API that is so good that developers prefer it over raw POSIX calls. Among other things that means using GObject. It also means not cloning the POSIX API, but providing higher-level, document-centric interfaces. GTK can directly use it, e.g. in the filechooser.

Applications use GVfs indirectly, by means of GIO loading the GVfs module that implements the GIO extension points. The GVfs main daemon gvfsd spawns further mount daemons for each individual connection. The GVfs support for volume monitoring is included in a separate loadable module.

The actual GVfs implementation is distributed over a number of processes.

GVfs can use FUSE to mount its VFS directly onto the filesystem. It consists of two parts:

1. a shared library which is loaded by applications supporting GIO
2. GVfs itself, which contains a collection of daemons which communicate with each other and the GIO module over D-Bus.

A collection of command-line utilities (such as gvfs-mount, gvfs-less) works with VFS resources.

- https://developer.gnome.org/gio/stable/ch01.html#gvfs-overview

Daemon	task
Main
gvfsd	gvfsd is the main daemon of GVfs. It provides the "org.gtk.vfs.Daemon" name on the session bus. gvfsd is autostarted by GIO clients if it is not running. The primary task of gvfsd is to act as a mount tracker/manager. It spawns new back-ends when requested and keeps track of their lifecycle, maintaining a list of active mounts and creates direct connections to them. gvfsd also starts the gvfsd-fuse(1), and provides it the mount point where the fuse file system should be mounted.
gvfsd-fuse	gvfsd-fuse maintains a FUSE (Filesystem in Userspace) mount to make GVfs back-ends available to POSIX applications. The mount point for the fuse filesystem is provided by the [PATH] argument. gvfsd-fuse is normally started by gvfsd.
gvfsd-metadata	gvfsd-metadata is a daemon acting as a write serialiser to the internal gvfs metadata storage. It is autostarted by GIO clients when they make metadata changes. Read operations are done by client-side GIO code directly, and don't require the daemon to be running. The gvfs metadata capabilities are used by the GNOME Files file manager, for example.
Volume monitors
gvfs-goa-volume-monitor	support for GNOME Online Accounts (cf. GNOME Online Accounts in the GNOME wiki)
gvfs-gphoto2-volume-monitor	support for the Picture Transfer Protocol as implemented in gPhoto
gvfs-mtp-volume-monitor	support for the Media Transfer Protocol
gvfs-udisks2-volume-monitor	The gvfs-udisks2-volume-monitor process is responsible for the disks, media, mounts and fstab entries shown in the desktop user interface. In particular, GNOME Shell, GNOME Files as well as any other application using the GLib APIs, is using information from this process. In Debian it is distributed as part of the gvfs-daemons package. It is not to be confused with udisksd and udisksctl, which are part of the udisks2 package. udisks: The udisks daemon serves as an interface to system block devices, implemented via D-Bus. It handles operations such as querying, mounting, unmounting, formatting, or detaching storage devices such as hard disks or USB thumb drives.
gvfs-afc-volume-monitor	support for Apple File Conduit
Mount back-ends
gvfsd-afc	mounts iPhone/iPod touch volumes
gvfsd-afp	mounts Apple Filing Protocol volumes
gvfsd-afp-browse	browses Apple Filing Protocol volumes
gvfsd-archive	mounts archive files in various formats
gvfsd-burn	provides a location for burning CDs/optical discs
gvfsd-cdda	mounts audio CDs
gvfsd-computer	provides computer://
gvfsd-dav	mounts DAV filesystems
gvfsd-dnssd	browses DNS-SD
gvfsd-ftp	mounts over FTP
gvfsd-gphoto2	mounts over PTP, meaning GVfs uses libgphoto2 to expose on-camera photos to GNOME applications via the VFS
gvfsd-http	mounts over HTTP
gvfsd-localtest	a test backend
gvfsd-mtp	mounts over MTP
gvfsd-network	provides network://
gvfsd-nfs	mounts over NFS protocol
gvfsd-recent	provides recent://
gvfsd-sftp	mounts over sftp
gvfsd-smb	mounts SMB (i.e. Windows Shares Filesystem) volumes
gvfsd-smb-browse	browses Windows Shares Filesystem volumes
gvfsd-trash	provides trash://

Please refer to https://wiki.gnome.org/Projects/gvfs/backends for the official documentation.

=== Hot plugging ===
Devices connected over eSATA or USB are (supposed to be) physically hot-pluggable. When a device is physically connected to or physically removed from the computer system, the Linux kernel notices and sends out an event to user-space. systemd-udevd receives such events and responds to them according to its quite comprehensive configuration:

- manages the special file system devfs mounted to /dev, hence systemd-udevd dynamically creates and removes device nodes from /dev, it also loads drivers as necessary at boot time
- in case of a block device systemd-udevd notifies udisksd, and gvfsd and gvfs-udisks2-volume-monitor.

The udisks2 daemon udisksd serves as an interface to system block devices, implemented via D-Bus. It handles operations such as querying, mounting, unmounting, formatting, or detaching storage devices such as hard disks or USB thumb drives. This package also provides the udisksctl utility, which can be used to trigger these operations from the command line (if permitted by PolicyKit).

=== Packaging ===
In Debian the GVfs is packaged into four packages: gvfs, gvfs-daemons, gvfs-bin and gvfs-backends.

== See also ==
- GNOME Files, the file manager for GNOME desktops, allows users to interact with GVfs filesystems
- Thunar, the file manager for the Xfce desktop environment, also provides filesystem abstraction using the GVfs library
- KIO, a similar facility for KDE systems
- Archivemount, a virtual filesystem implementation specifically for accessing archive files
