= PUFFS (NetBSD) =

Software

puffs
- Written in: C
- Operating system: NetBSD
- Type: File system driver
- License: BSD license

Pass-to-Userspace Framework File System (puffs) is a NetBSD kernel subsystem developed for running filesystems in userspace. It was added to NetBSD in the 5.0 release, and was ported to DragonFly BSD in the 3.2 release.

== Filesystem in Userspace compatibility ==
In NetBSD 5.0, puffs includes refuse, a reimplementation of the libfuse high-level interface. Some filesystems use the low-level libfuse interface or the kernel FUSE interface and they cannot be supported through refuse.

NetBSD 6.0 addresses that limitation through perfuse, a new compatibility layer that emulates the FUSE kernel interface.

== See also ==
- Filesystem in Userspace
