= SSHFS =

Filesystem client

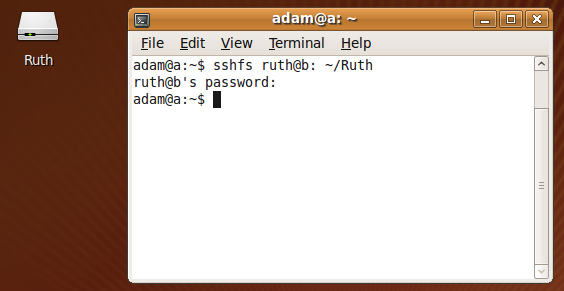
- Mounting an SSHFS network, the sign-on displays the desktop icon illustrated
- Developers: Nikolaus Rath, Miklos Szeredi
- Stable release: 3.7.5 / 11 November 2025; 26 days ago
- Repository: github.com/libfuse/sshfs
- Operating system: UNIX-like
- Type: Remote access
- Website: https://github.com/libfuse/sshfs

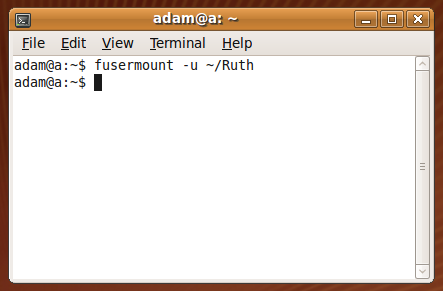
Unmounting (signing off) an SSHFS network

SSHFS (SSH Filesystem) is a filesystem client to mount and interact with directories and files located on a remote server or workstation over a normal ssh connection. The client interacts with the remote file system via the SSH File Transfer Protocol (SFTP), a network protocol providing file access, file transfer, and file management functionality over any reliable data stream that was designed as an extension of the Secure Shell protocol (SSH) version 2.0.

The current implementation of SSHFS using FUSE is a rewrite of an earlier version. The rewrite was done by Miklos Szeredi, who also wrote FUSE.

== Features ==
SFTP provides secure file transfer from a remote file system. While SFTP clients can transfer files and directories, they cannot mount the server's file system into the local directory tree. Using SSHFS, a remote file system may be treated in the same way as other volumes (such as hard drives or removable media).

Using the Unix command ls with sshfs will sometimes not list the owner of a file correctly, although it is possible to map them manually.

For distributed remote file systems with multiple users, protocols such as Apple Filing Protocol, Network File System and Server Message Block are more often used. SSHFS is an alternative to those protocols only in situations where users are confident that files and directories will not be targeted for writing by another user, at the same time.

The advantage of SSHFS when compared to other network file system protocols is that, given that a user already has SSH access to a host, it does not require any additional configuration work, or the opening of additional entry ports in a firewall.

== See also ==
- ExpanDrive
- Files transferred over shell protocol (FISH)
- FileZilla, a free software utility for multiple platforms.
- FTPFS
- GVfs
- SSH file transfer protocol (SFTP)
- Secure copy (SCP)
- WinSCP
