= Archivemount =

FUSE-based file system for Unix variants

archivemount
- Original author: Andre Landwehr
- Developer: Andre Landwehr
- Release: 2005; 21 years ago
- Final release: 0.9.1 / 20 April 2020; 6 years ago
- Written in: C
- Operating system: Unix-like
- Successor: Archivemount-ng
- Type: Special file system
- License: LGPL
- Website: www.cybernoia.de/software/archivemount.html
- Repository: github.com/cybernoid/archivemount

archivemount is a FUSE-based file system for Unix variants, including Linux. Its purpose is to mount archives (e.g. tar, tar.gz, etc.) to a mount point where it can be read from or written to as with any other file system. This makes accessing the contents of the archive, which may be compressed, transparent to other programs, without decompressing them. Archivemount depends on libarchive and will support any format that is supported by libarchive.

Archivemount was created in 2005 and maintained until his death in 2020 by Andre Landwehr, a code developer based in Germany.

== Archivemount-ng ==
An anonymous Polish programmer who goes by the handle "Nabijaczleweli" announced in June 2024 that they had forked the project and is the maintainer of the new Archivemount-ng project, the successor to Archivemount. The code was ported to C++ and most of the Archivemount bugs that had accumulated since 2020 were fixed. Debian unstable, OpenSUSE, Ubuntu (since Questing Quokka), Arch Linux, MacPorts, and Homebrew had replaced archivemount with archivemount-ng by early-2026.

The most recently released version of Archivemount-ng is version "1b" that was released in June 2025.

== See also ==
- GVfs
