= Chimping =

Checking every photo on the camera display immediately after capture

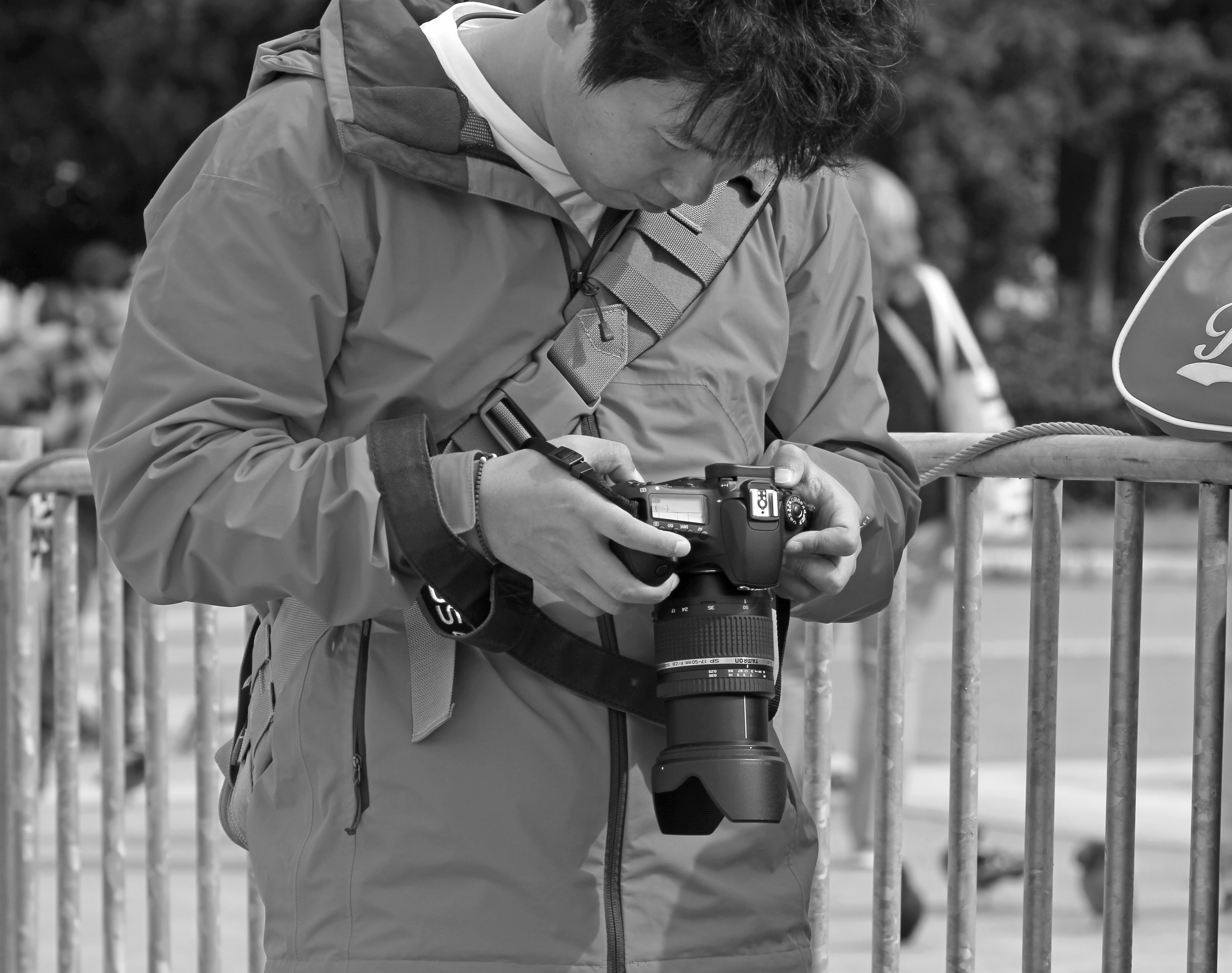
A tourist chimping on his Canon EOS 60D camera in Athens, Greece, on October 14, 2013

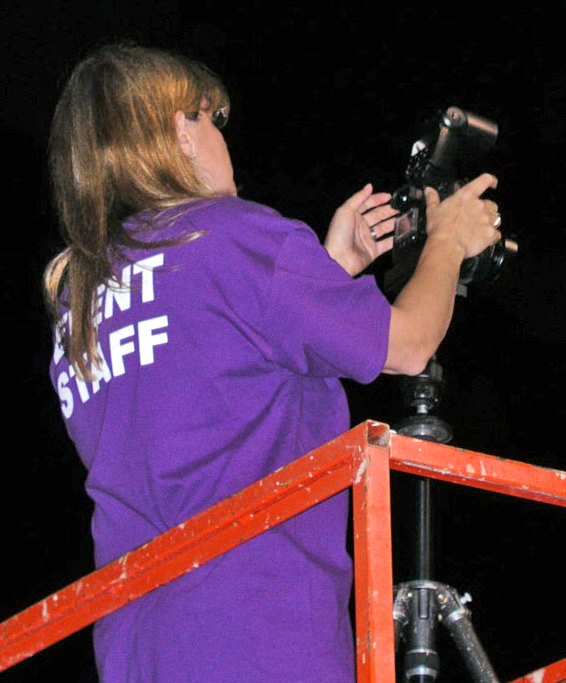
A photographer in the act of "chimping"

Chimping is a colloquial term used in digital photography to describe the habit of checking every photo on the camera display (LCD) immediately after capture.

Some photographers use the term in a derogatory sense to describe the actions of amateur photographers, but the act of reviewing images on-camera is not necessarily frowned upon by professional or experienced photographers.

== Origin of the term ==
The term 'chimping' was first written about by Robert Deutsch, a USA Today staff photographer, in September 1999 when writing a story for the SportsShooter email newsletter. He did not invent the term but heard it passed down by word of mouth.

The term derives from the habit of the photographer looking at the picture in the LCD, and saying "Ooh, ooh, ooh!" imitating the sound of a chimpanzee.

== Views on chimping ==
Stephen Johnson, in his book on digital photography, writes:

The implied pejorative [in the term 'chimping'] is shocking to me. If there's any one thing that is revolutionary in the advance of photography represented by this digital age, it is the ability to inspect your work. Ignore such ridicule, and use the tools to their fullest.

He further points out that using the LCD panel effectively means that a light meter can be left at home and if the shot isn't right, it can be tried again. Therefore, the idea that only "wannabe" photographers need to look at the LCD and check the exposure, image, or both may be unreasonable.

Some use the term "chimping" only to describe photographers who check their LCD screen excessively, such as after every single shot, and constantly interrupt the process of taking pictures in order to do so. This level of viewing is usually not necessary in order to check exposure and focus, and may lead to missed photo opportunities. A photographer can be occupied looking at the previous shot rather than actively photographing a scene unfolding in front of them.

Regardless of how the activity is viewed, it is now common to see photographers at media or sports events, "chimping" their shots, checking to see if they got the image they desired.
