= Coded exposure photography =

Motion blur reduction technology

Digital Camera

Coded exposure photography, also known as a flutter shutter, is the name given to any mathematical algorithm that reduces the effects of motion blur in photography. The key element of the coded exposure process is the mathematical formula that affects the shutter frequency. This involves the calculation of the relationship between the photon exposure of the light sensor and the randomized code. The camera is made to take a series of snapshots with random time intervals using a simple computer, this creates a blurred image that can be reconciled into a clear image using the algorithm.

Motion de-blurring technology grew due to increasing demand for clearer images in sporting events and other digital media. The relative inexpensiveness of the coded exposure technology makes it a viable alternative to expensive cameras and equipment that are built to take millions of images per second.

== History ==
Photography was developed to enable imaging of the visible world. Early cameras used film made of plastic coated with compounds of silver. The film is highly sensitive to light. When photons (light) hit the film a reaction occurs which semi-permanently stores the data on its surface. This film is then developed by exposing it to several chemicals to create the image. The film is highly sensitive and the process is complicated. It must be stored away from light to prevent spoilage.

Digital cameras use digital technologies to create images. This process involves exposing light-sensitive material to photons, creating electrical signals that are recorded in computer files. This process is simple and has improved the availability of photography. One problem that digital cameras have faced is motion blur. Motion blur occurs when the camera or the subject are in motion. When motion blur happens, the resulting image is blurry, fuzzy edges and indistinct features. One solution to remove motion blur in photography is to increase the shutter speed of the camera. Unlike the coded exposure process, shutter speed is a purely physical process where the camera shutter is opened and closed more quickly, resulting in short exposure time. This reduces the amount of motion that occupies each frame. However shorter exposure times increase the 'noise', which can affect image quality.

== Coded exposure ==
Coded exposure solves the motion blur problem without the negative effects of shorter exposure times. It is an algorithm designed to open the camera's shutter in a pattern that enables the image to be processed in such a way that motion blur and noise are almost completely removed. Contrary to other methods of de-blurring, coded exposure does not require additional hardware beyond a digital camera.

The key element of the coded exposure process is the formula that affects the shutter frequency. The process calculates the relationship between the exposure of the light sensor and the randomized code. The digital camera takes a series of snapshots at random intervals. This creates a blurred image that can be clarified given the code or the algorithm. Together with compressed sensing, this technique can be effective.

== Application ==
The relative inexpensiveness of the coded exposure technology makes it a viable alternative to expensive cameras and equipment that takes millions of images per second. However, the algorithm and subsequent de-blurring is a complicated process that requires specialists who can write the programs and create templates for companies to work from. Ownership of the technology is subject to dispute; no patent covers it.

Coded exposure could have application on live television. Accurate footage of sporting events requires a clear image and detail. Short exposure cameras have been used, but coded exposure is typically available at a lower cost. As of October 2019, the technology had not been widely used outside of a research environment.
