= PictBridge =

Historical computing industry standard

The PictBridge logo

PictBridge is a historical computing industry standard introduced in 2003 from the Camera & Imaging Products Association (CIPA) for direct printing. It allows images to be printed directly from digital cameras to a printer, without them having to connect to each other. Its formal name is "Standard of Camera & Imaging Products Association CIPA DC-001—2003 Digital Solutions for Imaging Devices". CIPA DC-001-2003 Rev. 2.0 has been published in 2007.

== Implementation ==
PictBridge is usually implemented using USB ports and the USB protocol. PictBridge-capable printers typically have a USB type A port, which is connected by cable to the USB port of a PictBridge-capable digital camera (usually a Mini-B USB cable). The user selects the images on the camera to print.

== Licensing ==
The PictBridge specification is not an open standard; it can only be obtained from CIPA after agreement not to disclose any information from the specification to others. In practice, that means PictBridge cannot be implemented as free and open-source software, other than by reverse engineering the protocol, if publishing source code of an implementation of the PictBridge standard is considered "disclosing information" from the specification.

A printer may implement functions similar to a PictBridge printer without the non-disclosure agreement merely by treating the camera's memory as a USB mass storage device, although the user interface for image selection would necessarily be on the printer rather than the camera in this case.

== See also ==
- Digital Print Order Format
- Mopria Alliance
- Picture Transfer Protocol
