= ExpanDrive =

Network filesystem client

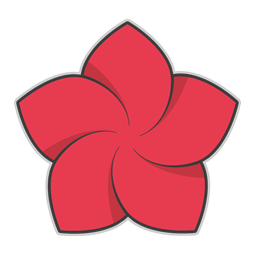
- Developers: ExpanDrive, Inc

Preview release(s) [±]
- Operating system: MacOS, Microsoft Windows, Linux
- Available in: English
- Type: SFTP/FTP client
- License: Proprietary
- Website: www.expandrive.com

ExpanDrive is a network filesystem client for MacOS, Microsoft Windows and Linux that facilitates mapping of local volume to many different types of cloud storage. When a server is mounted with ExpanDrive any program can read, write, and manage remote files (that is, files that only exist on the server) as if they were stored locally. This is different from most file transfer clients because it is integrated into all applications on the operating system. It also does not require a file to be downloaded to access portions of the content.

As of April 2025, ExpanDrive operates under a freemium model. The core application is free for personal use and for organizations with up to 10 users annually.

A paid subscription, priced at US$99/month, is required for commercial use, larger teams, and access to ExpanDrive for Teams and Server Edition, which includes technical support. Perpetual licenses are no longer offered; licenses sold prior to 2024 remain functional but are not supported under the new ownership.

ExpanDrive uses a custom FUSE implementation as its file system implementation layer on the Mac and Windows and system-packaged FUSE on Linux.

== History ==
SftpDrive was the original version of ExpanDrive for Microsoft Windows. It was commercial software with a 6-week trial.

ExpanDrive 2 was released on June 21, 2011 adding support for plain FTP, Amazon S3 and a new ExpanDrive service named Strongspace Online Storage. ExpanDrive2 included a rewritten SFTP engine which laid the groundwork for a unified Mac and Windows code base.

Version 2.4, released in January 2013 was the first version to be released simultaneously for Windows and Mac.

ExpanDrive 3 was released on May 14, 2013, with a new user-interface and support for more drive types such as Dropbox, OpenStack, Rackspace and WebDAV.

ExpanDrive 4 was released on June 12, 2014, with dramatically faster access. ExpanDrive 4 also added support for Microsoft OneDrive, Copy.com, HP Helion Cloud, Owncloud and hubiC.

ExpanDrive 5 was released on June 15, 2015, with a near-total rewrite of its core functionality.

ExpanDrive 6 was released on July 5, 2017, followed by a redesign to version 6.1 on September 25, 2017. The most recent version v6.3 was released on November 2, 2018.

ExpanDrive 7 was released on May 8, 2019, which added support for Linux, A cloud storage browser and transfer application, multi-user file locking, search and version management.

New features include improved performance and file versioning. An increased list of supported storage and cloud storage providers have been introduced since version 5, including Dropbox, Google Drive, Google Team Drives, Amazon Drive, Box, OneDrive, OneDrive for Business, SharePoint, Openstack Swift, BackBlaze B2, Amazon S3 as well as the original SFTP, FTP or WebDAV server and SMB/Windows File Sharing.

In early 2024, users began reporting that support tickets were no longer being answered, new purchases failed to activate properly, and certain functionality, particularly on Linux, stopped working.

Public reviews and support forums noted that technical support had become unresponsive, with no official communication from the company at the time.

In 2024, ExpanDrive was acquired by Files.com. Over the following year, the company underwent a full transition to a new development and management team, with the original founders no longer involved in the project.

In April 2025, the new ownership announced a formal relaunch of the product, introducing a revised pricing structure. The application became free for personal use and for organizations with up to 10 users per year, while commercial use or deployments beyond that threshold require a paid subscription, which includes technical support and access to advanced features.

Lifetime or perpetual licenses sold by the prior owner apply only to legacy versions of ExpanDrive (version 2023 and earlier) and are no longer eligible for technical support.

As the prior ownership entity is no longer active, these licenses are not transferable to the current product line.

Under the new ownership, users who purchased a non-recurring license for ExpanDrive, S3Pro, or StrongSync within the 12 months prior to the April 2025 relaunch are being offered a full refund.

The new owners state that refunds are offered as a courtesy and are not available for purchases made more than 12 months prior and that the prior owners are no longer a going concern.

== See also ==
- Secure Shell (SSH)
- SSHFS
