= FTPDrive =

File system and network redirector

FTP Drive is an installable file system and network redirector for NT-based Microsoft Windows operating systems. This program is a File Transfer Protocol (FTP) client whose functionality can be accessed from any file manager in an OS. FTP servers have to be configured in a special applet and appear in Windows explorer (or any other file manager) as subdirectories of a (virtual) network drive (the drive letter also can be configured). As of October 28, 2007, this program is freeware.

Read-only file access can be completely transparent to applications, as long as they do not use very large memory-mapped files. Random write access is not possible due to limitations of the protocol. It is possible to copy files to a server, and programs which write files sequentially, as one operation, should not have problems with write access. This program has some support for FTP over SSL and TLS.

It is reported to be incompatible with 64 bit Windows systems.
