= Digital Print Order Format =

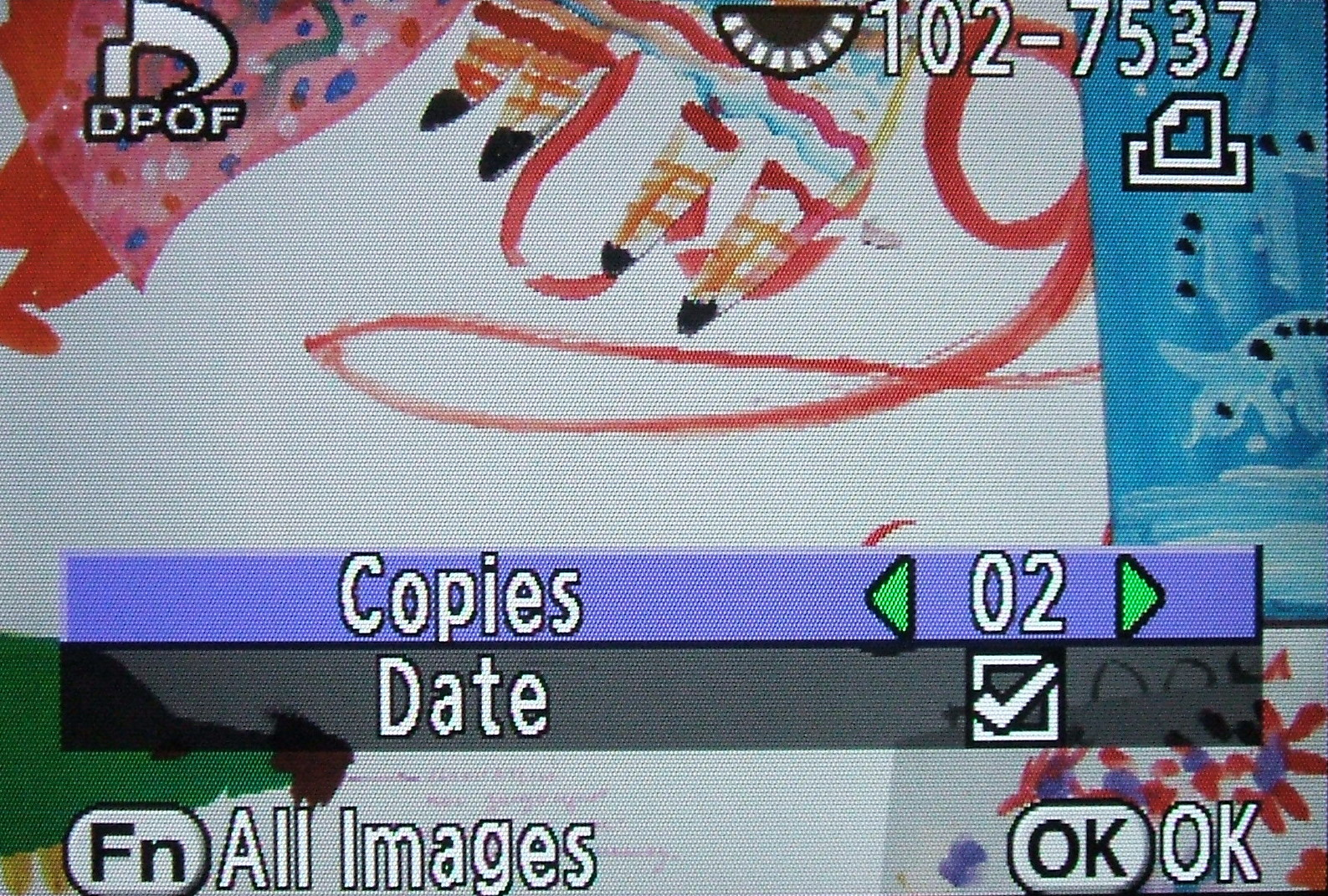
A Simple DPOF menu on a Pentax k200d digital camera.

DPOF (Digital Print Order Format) is a format which allows the user of a digital camera or other device such as a mobile phone or PDA to define which captured images on the storage card are to be printed, together with information on the number of copies or other image information such as paper size, image title text, image orientation, contact information and more.

DPOF usually consists of a set of text files in a special directory on the storage card. This option can be accessed through one of the menu modes on the camera. The storage card can then be taken to a print shop or output through compatible desktop printers at home.

DPOF was developed by a consortium of printer and camera manufacturers including Canon, Inc., Eastman Kodak, Fujifilm and Matsushita Electric Industrial Co. Originally released in October 1998, the specification was updated to version 1.10 on July 17, 2000.

The current version adds features which include

- Printing multiple images on one sheet (contact sheets)
- Specifying the size of the print
- Sending images via fax and Internet transmissions
- Support for slide shows through an auto-play feature.

== See also ==
- PictBridge
